= Onium ion =

Class of positively-charged molecules

In chemistry, an onium ion is a cation formally obtained by the protonation of mononuclear parent hydride of a pnictogen (group 15 of the periodic table), chalcogen (group 16), or halogen (group 17). The oldest-known onium ion, and the namesake for the class, is ammonium, NH^{+}_{4}, the protonated derivative of ammonia, NH_{3}.

The name onium is also used for cations that would result from the substitution of hydrogen atoms in those ions by other groups, such as organic groups, or halogens; such as tetraphenylphosphonium, (C_{6}H_{5})_{4}P^{+}. The substituent groups may be divalent or trivalent, yielding ions such as iminium and nitrilium.

A simple onium ion has a charge of +1. A larger ion that has two onium ion subgroups is called a double onium ion, and has a charge of +2. A triple onium ion has a charge of +3, and so on.

Compounds of an onium cation and some other anion are known as onium compounds or onium salts.

Onium ions and onium compounds are inversely analogous to -ate ions and ate complexes:

- Lewis bases form onium ions when the central atom gains one more bond and becomes a positive cation.
- Lewis acids form -ate ions when the central atom gains one more bond and becomes a negative anion.

== Onium ions by group ==
=== Group 13 (boron group) onium cations ===
- boronium cation, BH^{+}_{4} (protonated borane)
  - further boronium cations, B_{x}H^{+}_{y} (protonated boranes)

=== Group 14 (carbon group) onium cations ===
- Carbonium ions (protonated hydrocarbons) have a pentacoordinated carbon atom with a +1 charge. The specific cation CH^{+}_{5} is called methanium.. Typically named for the parent hydrocarbon, e.g. C_{2}H^{+}_{7} is ethanium.
- silanium (sometimes silonium), SiH^{+}_{5} (protonated silane) (should not be called siliconium)
  - disilanium, Si_{2}H^{+}_{7} (protonated disilane)
  - further silanium cations, Si_{n}H^{+}_{2n+3} (protonated silanes)
- germonium, GeH^{+}_{5} (protonated germane) Unstable derivative known of R_{3}Ge^{+}.
- stannonium, SnH^{+}_{3} (protonated stannylene, SnH_{2}) (not protonated stannane SnH_{4}) stable at cryogenic conditions.

=== Group 15 (pnictogen) onium cations ===
- ammonium (IUPAC name azanium), NH^{+}_{4} (protonated ammonia (IUPAC name azane)) exists in aqueous solution and as salts.
  - primary, secondary, and tertiary organic derivatives [NH_{n}R_{4−n}]^{+}, derived from protonation of amines; e.g. methylammonium halides, diethylammonium chloride, trimethylammonium
  - quaternary ammonium cations NR^{+}_{4}; e.g. tetrabutylammonium
- phosphonium, PH^{+}_{4} (protonated phosphine)
  - primary, secondary, and tertiary organic derivatives [PH_{n}R_{4−n}]^{+}, derived from protonation of phosphines
  - quaternary phosphonium cations PR^{+}_{4}; e.g. tetraphenylphosphonium
- arsonium, AsH^{+}_{4} (protonated arsine) known as derivatives or as an unstable salt at cryogenic temperatures.
- stibonium, SbH^{+}_{4} (protonated stibine) known as derivatives but no salts are known.
- bismuthonium, BiH^{+}_{4} (protonated bismuthine) only known as derivatives.

=== Group 16 (chalcogen) onium cations ===
- oxonium, H_{3}O^{+} (protonated water (IUPAC name oxidane). Oxonium is better known as hydronium, though hydronium implies a solvated or hydrated proton. It may also be called hydroxonium.)
  - Organic derivatives can be primary (ROH^{+}_{2}, protonated alcohols), secondary (R_{2}OH^{+}, protonated ethers), or ternary (R_{3}O^{+}, as trimethyloxonium).
- peroxonium, H_{3}O^{+}_{2} (protonated hydrogen peroxide)
- sulfonium, H_{3}S^{+} (protonated hydrogen sulfide)
  - Organic derivatives can be primary (H_{2}SR^{+}, protonated thiols), secondary (HSR^{+}_{2}, protonated thioethers), or ternary (SR^{+}_{3}, e.g. trimethylsulfonium)
- selenonium, H_{3}Se^{+} (protonated hydrogen selenide)
  - Tertiary organic derivatives R_{3}Se^{+} are known, with trimethylselenonium iodide being the first.
- telluronium, H_{3}Te^{+} (protonated hydrogen telluride)

=== Hydrogen onium cation ===
- hydrogenonium, better known as trihydrogen cation, H^{+}_{3} (protonated molecular or diatomic hydrogen), found in ionized hydrogen and interstellar space

=== Group 17 (halogen) onium cations, halonium ions, H_{2}X^{+} (protonated hydrogen halides) ===
- fluoronium, H_{2}F^{+} (protonated hydrogen fluoride)
- chloronium, H_{2}Cl^{+} (protonated hydrogen chloride)
- bromonium, H_{2}Br^{+} (protonated hydrogen bromide)
- iodonium, H_{2}I^{+} (protonated hydrogen iodide)

==== Pseudohalogen onium cations ====
- aminodiazonium, [H_{2}N=N=N]^{+} ⇌ [H_{2}N−N≡N]^{+} (protonated hydrogen azide)
- methylidyneammonium and hydrocyanonium, H_{2}CN^{+}, isomers HC≡NH^{+} ⇌ N≡CH^{+}_{2} (protonated hydrogen cyanide)

=== Group 18 (noble gas) onium cations ===
- hydrohelium or helonium, better known as helium hydride ion, HeH^{+} (protonated helium) known in gas phase.
- neonium, NeH^{+} (protonated neon) known in gas phase.
- argonium, ArH^{+} (protonated argon) known in gas phase.
- kryptonium, KrH^{+} (protonated krypton) known in gas phase.
- xenonium, XeH^{+} (protonated xenon) known in gas phase.

== Onium cations with monovalent substitutions ==
- tertiary selenonium cations, R_{3}Se^{+}
  - triphenylselenonium, (C_{6}H_{5})_{3}Se^{+}
- tertiary telluronium cations, R_{3}Te^{+}
  - triphenyltelluronium, (C_{6}H_{5})_{3}Te^{+}
- primary fluoronium cations, RFH^{+} (protonated fluorides RF)
- secondary fluoronium cations, R_{2}F^{+}
  - dichlorofluoronium, Cl_{2}F^{+}
- secondary iodonium cations, R_{2}I^{+}
  - diphenyliodonium, (C_{6}H_{5})_{2}I^{+}

== Onium cations with polyvalent substitutions ==
- secondary ammonium cations having one double-bonded substitution, R=NH^{+}_{2}
  - diazenium, HN=NH^{+}_{2} (protonated diazene)
  - guanidinium, C(NH_{2})^{+}_{3} (protonated guanidine) (has a resonance structure and a planar molecular geometry)
- tertiary ammonium cations having one triple-bonded substitution, R≡NH+
  - nitrilium, R−C≡NH^{+} (protonated nitrile)
  - diazonium or diazynium, N≡NH^{+} (protonated [di-]nitrogen; in other words, protonated diazyne)
- cyclic tertiary ammonium cations where nitrogen is a member of a ring, RNH^{+}R (the ring may be aromatic)
  - pyridinium, C_{5}H_{5}NH^{+} (protonated pyridine)
- quaternary ammonium cations having one double-bonded substitution and two single-bonded substitutions, R=NR^{+}_{2}
  - iminium, R_{2}C=NR^{+}_{2} (substituted protonated imine)
  - diazenium, RN=NR^{+}_{2} (substituted protonated diazene)
  - thiazolium, [C_{3}NSR_{4}]^{+}(substituted protonated thiazole)
- quaternary ammonium cations having two double-bonded substitutions, R=N^{+}=R
  - nitronium, [NO_{2}]^{+}
  - bis(triphenylphosphine)iminium, ((C_{6}H_{5})_{3}P=)_{2}N^{+}
- quaternary ammonium cations having one triple-bonded substitution and one single-bonded substitution, R≡NR^{+}
  - diazonium, N≡NR^{+} (substituted protonated [di-]nitrogen; in other words, substituted protonated diazyne)
  - nitrilium, RC≡NR^{+} (substituted protonated nitrile)
- tertiary oxonium cations having one triple-bonded substitution, R≡O^{+}
  - acylium ions, R−C≡O^{+} ↔ R−C^{+}=O
  - nitrosonium, N≡O^{+}
- tertiary sulfonium cations having one triple-bonded substitution, R≡S^{+}
  - thionitrosyl, N≡S^{+}
- dihydroxyoxoammonium, [H_{2}NO_{3}]^{+} (protonated nitric acid)
- trihydroxyoxosulfonium, [H_{3}SO_{4}]^{+} (protonated sulfuric acid)
- cyclic tertiary onium cations
  - pyrylium, C_{5}H_{5}O^{+}
  - thiopyrylium, C_{5}H_{5}S^{+}
  - selenopyrylium, C_{5}H_{5}Se^{+}
  - telluropyrylium, C_{5}H_{5}Te^{+}

== Double onium dications ==
- hydrazinediium or hydrazinium(2+) dication, H_{3}N^{+}−^{+}NH_{3} (doubly protonated hydrazine, in other words, doubly protonated diazane)
- diazenediium cation, H_{2}N^{+}=^{+}NH_{2} (doubly protonated diazene)
- diazynediium cation, HN^{+}≡^{+}NH (doubly protonated [di-]nitrogen; in other words, doubly protonated diazyne)

== Enium cations ==
The extra bond is added to a less-common parent hydride, a carbene analog, typically named -ene or -ylene, which is neutral with 2 fewer bonds than the more-common hydride, typically named -ane or -ine.

- borenium cations, R_{2}B^{+} (protonated borylenes a.k.a. boranylidenes)
- carbenium cations, R_{3}C^{+} (protonated carbenes) have a tricoordinated carbon atom with a +1 charge.
  - alkenium cations, C_{n}H^{+}_{2n+1} (n ≥ 2) (protonated alkenes)
    - methenium cation, H_{3}C^{+} (protonated methylene)
    - ethenium, C_{2}H^{+}_{5} (protonated ethene)
  - benzenium, C_{6}H^{+}_{7} (protonated benzene)
  - tropylium, C_{7}H^{+}_{7} (protonated tropylidene)
- silylium cations, R_{3}Si^{+} (protonated silylenes)
- nitrenium cations, R_{2}N^{+} (protonated nitrenes)
- phosphinidenium cations, R_{2}P^{+} (protonated phosphinidene)
- mercurinium cations, R_{3}Hg^{+} (protonated organomercury compounds; formed as intermediates in oxymercuration reactions)

=== Substituted eniums ===
- diphenylcarbenium, (C_{6}H_{5})_{2}CH^{+} (di-substituted methenium)
- triphenylcarbenium, (C_{6}H_{5})_{3}C^{+} (tri-substituted methenium)

== Ynium cations ==
- carbynium ions (protonated carbynes) have a carbon atom with a +1 charge.
  - alkynium cations, C_{n}H^{+}_{2n-1} (n ≥ 2) (protonated alkynes)
    - methynium cation, H_{2}C^{+} (protonated methylidyne radical)
    - ethynium, C_{2}H^{+}_{3} (protonated ethyne)

== See also ==
- Carbonium ion
- Lyonium ion, a protonated solvent molecule
- Lyate ion, a deprotonated solvent molecule
