= Radical cation =

Structure of Wurster's cation, illustrating the ability of amino substituents to stabilize arene radical cations.

Radical cations are denoted $M^{\bullet +}$. Salts of these species have been isolated in the cases of dibenzocyclooctatetraene, various tertiary amines, and some polymethylated derivatives of azulene. Radical cations, like radical anions, have one unpaired electron, i.e. they are paramagnetic.

== Mass spectrometry ==
Radical cations appear prominently in mass spectrometry. When a gas-phase molecule is subjected to electron ionization one electron is abstracted by an electron in the electron beam to create a radical cation M^{+.}. This species represents the molecular ion or parent ion. A typical mass spectrum shows multiple signals because the molecular ion fragments into a complex mixture of ions and uncharged radical species. For example, the methanol radical cation fragments into a methenium cation CH^{+}_{3} and a hydroxyl radical. In naphthalene the unfragmented radical cation is by far the most prominent peak in the mass spectrum. Secondary species are generated from proton gain (M+1) and proton loss (M-1).

== Inorganic examples ==
Some compounds containing the dioxygenyl cation can be prepared in bulk. Many transition metal complexes are radicals and cationic, e.g. [MCl_{4}]^{2-} (M=Mn, Fe, Co, Ni). Such species are so pervasive that they are rarely discussed in the context of radicals.

== Organic heterocycles and polymers ==
Radical cations figure prominently in the chemistry and properties of conducting polymers. Such polymers are formed by the oxidation of heterocycles to give radical cations, which condense with the parent heterocycle. For example, polypyrrole is prepared by oxidation of pyrrole using ferric chloride in methanol:

n C_{4}H_{4}NH + 2 FeCl_{3} → (C_{4}H_{2}NH)_{n} + 2 FeCl_{2} + 2 HCl

Upon further oxidation, these polymers become conductive, forming p-doped conducting polymers. These typically (Note: Excluding ground-state degenerate polymers such as trans-polyacetylene.) owe their conductivity to the transport of (positive) polarons, (Note: N-doped conducting polymers contain negative polarons, analogous radical anion defects. However, these are less commonly encountered due to such polymers' very high reduction potentials and consequent air- and solvent- sensitivity.) radical cation defects with resonance structures where the radical and cation are on separate atoms, associated with a localized change in bond-length alternation within the conjugated system, as well as bipolarons, classically considered to be non-radical dications in equilibrium with polarons.

== Carbocations ==
Carbocations are diamagnetic ions with a positively charged carbon atom. Carbocation are further classified in two main categories according to the coordination number of the charged carbon: three in the carbenium ions and five in the carbonium ions. Among the simplest carbocations are the methenium CH^{+}_{3} (a carbenium ion) and methanium CH^{+}_{5} (a carbonium ion).

== See also ==
- Radical anion
- Distonic ion
