= Ethenium =

Ethenium (C_{2}H^{+}_{5})

In chemistry, ethenium, protonated ethylene or ethyl cation is a positive ion with the formula C_{2}H^{+}_{5}. It can be viewed as a molecule of ethylene (C_{2}H_{4}) with one added proton (H^{+}), or a molecule of ethane (C_{2}H_{6}) minus one hydride ion (H^{−}). It is a carbocation; more specifically, a nonclassical carbocation.

== Preparation ==
Ethenium has been observed in rarefied gases subjected to radiation. Another preparation method is to react certain proton donors such as H^{+}_{3}, HeH^{+}, N_{2}H^{+}, and N_{2}OH^{+} with ethane at ambient temperature and pressures below 1 mmHg. (Other donors such as CH^{+}_{5} and HCO^{+} form ethanium preferably to ethenium.)

At room temperature and in a rarefied methane atmosphere, ethanium slowly dissociates to ethenium and H_{2}. The reaction is much faster at 90 °C.

== Stability and reactions ==
Contrary to some earlier reports, ethenium was found to be largely unreactive towards neutral methane at ambient temperature and low pressure (on the order of 1 mmHg), even though the reaction yielding sec-C_{3}H^{+}_{7} and H_{2} is believed to be exothermic.

== Structure ==
The structure of ethenium's ground state was in dispute for many years, but it was eventually agreed to be a non-classical structure, with the two carbon atoms and one of the hydrogen atoms forming a three-center two-electron bond. Calculations have shown that higher homologues, like the propyl and n-butyl cations also have bridged structures. Generally speaking, bridging appears to be a common means by which primary carbocations (carbocations with one alkyl group) achieve additional stabilization. Consequently, true primary carbocations (with a classical structure) may be rare or nonexistent.
