= CH3 =

CH3 may refer to:

- Channel 3 (band)
- Channel 3 (Thai television network)
- Methenium (methyl cation)
- Methyl group (in chemistry)
- Methyl radical (in chemistry)
- Church Hymnal, third edition (Hymnbooks of the Church of Scotland)
