= C5H9ClO =

The molecular formula C_{5}H_{9}ClO (molar mass: 120.58 g/mol) may refer to:

- Pentanoyl chloride, an acyl chloride derived from pentanoic acid
- Pivaloyl chloride, a branched-chain acyl chloride
