= Yuri Berlin =

American chemist (born 1944)

- Юрий Альфредович Берлин (Russian)
- Born: December 12, 1944; Moscow, USSR
- Education: Moscow Engineering Physics Institute; Moscow Institute for Physics and Technology
- Scientific career
- Doctoral advisor: Victor Talrose

Yuri Alfredovich Berlin (Russian: Юрий Альфредович Берлин; born December 12, 1944) is an American physical chemist and research professor in the department of chemistry at Northwestern University.

== Academic career ==
After completing his PhD, Berlin held numerous research positions at the N. N. Semenov Institute of Chemical Physics, Russian Academy of Sciences. In 1978, he became a senior research fellow under supervision of Vitalii Goldanski and a lecturer in the faculty of Chemical Physics at the Moscow Institute for Physics and Technology. In 1986, he was promoted to the position of the group leader and the head of the Laboratory of Non-Linear Physical and Chemical Processes. From 1986 to 1998, Berlin was a member of the Academic Council of the N. N. Semenov Institute of Chemical Physics.

In 2005, he became an elected member of the Executive Committee of the Miller Trust for Radiation Chemistry, UK. He also was an organizer, member of program committee and a co-chair of the Russian-French Seminar on Chemical Physics and a co-chair of the European Science Foundation Conference "Charge Transfer in Biosystems". In 1993 and 1994, Berlin was invited to teach PhD students and to perform scientific research in the Institute for Molecular Science in Okazaki, Japan. After working in Japan, he held the position of guest professor in Chemical Physics and Biophysics at the Institute of Theoretical Physics at Technical University of Munich (TUM), Germany. Following his appointment at TUM, Berlin joined the chemistry department of Northwestern University, where he is a research professor. Berlin was a member of the editorial boards of the scientific journals "Russian Chemical Bulletin", "Chemical Physics Report" and a guest editor of "Chemical Physics".

== Research ==
Berlin has undertaken research on a broad range of areas in both physical and theoretical chemistry, involving stochastic dynamics of complex systems, chemical kinetics and transport of active species in condensed phase and in biological molecules, physical chemistry of liquids and solids, theoretical biophysics and physical aspects of prebiotic evolution, physical methods for the initiation of chemical reactions, in particular cryochemistry, radiation chemistry, photo, and high pressure chemistry. His research covers a vast range of fields, such as the theory of excess electrons in non-polar liquids and liquid noble gases, charge transfer under extreme conditions, chemical processes coupled to structural rearrangements of molecular environment, dispersive kinetics, the effects of correlated fluctuations in chemical and biological properties, the role of static and dynamic disorder in the mechanism of chemical processes in condensed media. Later works are focused on mechanism and kinetics of charge transfer and transport in DNA, culminated in a series of studies of various DNA constructs as building blocks of molecular circuitry.
