= Evelyn effect =

Chemical phenomenon

The Evelyn effect is defined as the phenomena in which the product ratios in a chemical reaction change as the reaction proceeds. This phenomenon contradicts the fundamental principle in organic chemistry by reactions always go by the lowest energy pathway. The favored product should remain so throughout a reaction run at constant conditions. However, the ratio of alkenes before the synthesis is complete shows that the favored product is not the favored product. The basic idea here is that the proportions of the various alkene products changes as a function of time with a change in mechanism.

== Background on discovery ==
Professor David Todd at Pomona College was testing the dehydration of 2-methylcyclohexanol or 4-methylcyclohexanol c. 1994 and unexpectedly interrupted the alkene distillation midway to have lunch with his secretary, Evelyn Jacoby. After lunch, he continued his distillation but kept the early products separate from the completed ones. The analysis showed two different alkene ratios. The reaction products and pathways to the products seem to have changed over time. Dr. Todd called this phenomenon the “Evelyn effect.”

== Dehydration of 2-methylcyclohexanol or 4-methylcyclohexanol ==
-A simple example of the Evelyn effect is the sophomore level chemistry lab experiment involving two popular examples that are listed below.

a) Dehydration of 4-methylcyclohexanol

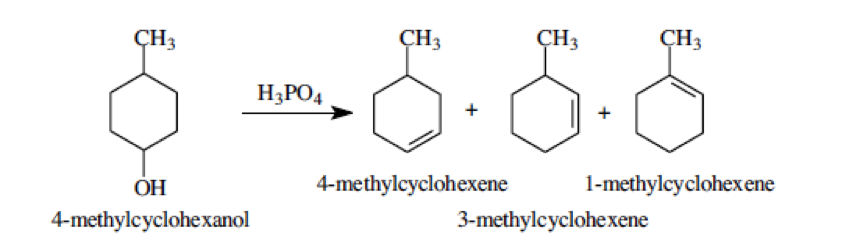
Dehydration of 4-methylcyclohexanol.jpeg

b) Dehydration of 2-Methylcyclohexanol

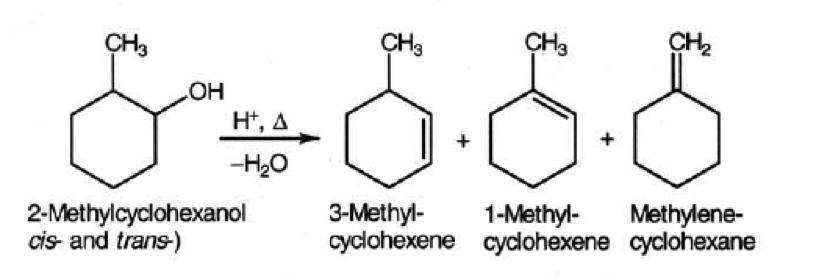
Dehydration of 2-Methylcyclohexanol.jpeg

c) Mechanism for the dehydration of 2-methylcyclohexanol

== Possible explanations of different ratio formations ==
- In general, if more than one alkene can be formed during dehalogenation by an elimination reaction, the more stable alkene is the major product. There are two types of elimination reactions, E1 and E2. An E2 reaction is a One step mechanism in which carbon-hydrogen and carbon-halogen bonds break to form a double bond. C=C Pi bond. An E1 reaction is the Ionization of the carbon-halogen bond breaking to give a carbocation intermediate, then the Deprotonation of the carbocation.
- For these two reactions, there are 3 possible products, 3-methyl-cyclohexene,1-methyl-cyclohexene, methylene-cyclohexane. The production of each of these occurs at different rates and the ratios of these also change over time. It is well known that the dehydration of the cis isomer is 30 times faster than the trans isomer. It then appears that the reaction proceeds mainly by a trans mechanism and, following the Zaitsev rule, 1-methylcyclohexene is preferentially formed in the early stages of the reaction. Indeed, if only about 10% of the total distillate is collected as the first fraction, one finds that the alkene is about 93% l-methylcyclohexene: at the end of the distillation one finds a value as low as 55% of l-methyl isomer.
- From these results, the phenomenon of the Evelyn effect can be observed and a conclusion can be drawn that a change of mechanism occurs somewhere during the synthesis.

== Additional study on the Evelyn effect ==
A kinetic and regional chemical study of the Evelyn effect has been described. The results, in the Journal of Chemical Education, made claims involving the mechanism by which the dehydrations occurred.

The article looks into the claim of having E1 and E2 mechanisms occur in the reaction. The researchers measured the kinetics of the formation of a 3 degree carbocation’s and compared them to theoretical calculations that would occur if the experiment ran as an E2 reaction. Instead, the reaction showed a mechanism that initially formed a 2 degree carbocation, utilizing an E1 pathway. Their conclusion was that the mechanism is neither E1 or E2 but rather “E-2 like”, exhibiting first order kinetics.
