= Methanium =

Ion of carbon with five hydrogens

- "True" methanium, the metastable transitional state [CH_{5}]^{+}

- Fluxional methanium, [CH_{3}(H_{2})]^{+}

Names
- IUPAC name Methanium
- Other names carbonium (discouraged due to multiple definitions)

Identifiers
3D model (JSmol)	true methanium: Interactive image; fluxional methanium: Interactive image
PubChem CID	21881157
- InChI: true methanium: InChI=1S/CH5/h1H5/q+1 Key: PXOFOHGGCICFQD-UHFFFAOYSA-N; fluxional methanium: InChI=1S/CH5/c1-2/h2H,1H3/q+1 Key: AJLDAZFHECSILY-UHFFFAOYSA-N
- SMILES: true methanium: [C+H5]; fluxional methanium: [CH3+].[HH]

Properties
Chemical formula	CH^{+}_{5}
Molar mass	17.051 g·mol^{−1}
Conjugate base	Methane

Structure
Molecular shape	trigonal bipyramidal
- Except where otherwise noted, data are given for materials in their standard state (at 25 °C [77 °F], 100 kPa). Infobox references

In chemistry, methanium is a complex positive ion with formula [CH_{5}]^{+} (metastable transitional form, a carbon atom covalently bonded to five hydrogen atoms) or [CH_{3}(H_{2})]^{+} (fluxional form, namely a molecule with one carbon atom covalently bonded to three hydrogen atoms and one dihydrogen molecule), bearing a +1 electric charge. It is a superacid and one of the onium ions, indeed the simplest carbonium ion.

It is highly unstable and highly reactive even upon having a complete octet, thus granting its superacidic properties.

Methanium can be produced in the laboratory as a rarefied gas or as a dilute species in superacids. It was prepared for the first time in 1950 and published in 1952 by Victor Talrose and his assistant Anna Konstantinovna Lyubimova. It occurs as an intermediate species in chemical reactions.

The methanium ion is named after methane (CH_{4}), by analogy with the derivation of ammonium ion (NH^{+}_{4}) from ammonia (NH_{3}).

== Structure ==
Fluxional methanium can be visualised as a CH^{+}_{3} carbenium ion with a molecule of hydrogen interacting with the empty orbital in a 3-center-2-electron bond. The bonding electron pair in the H_{2} molecule is shared between the two hydrogen and one carbon atoms making up the 3-center-2-electron bond.

The two hydrogen atoms in the H_{2} molecule can continuously exchange positions with the three hydrogen atoms in the CH^{+}_{3} ion (a conformation change called pseudorotation, specifically the Berry mechanism). The methanium ion is therefore considered a fluxional molecule. The energy barrier for the exchange is quite low and occurs even at very low temperatures.

Infrared spectroscopy has been used to obtain information about the different conformations of the methanium ion. The IR spectrum of plain methane has two C-H bands from symmetric and asymmetric stretching at around 3000 cm^{−1} and two bands around 1400 cm^{−1} from symmetrical and asymmetric bending vibrations. In the spectrum of CH^{+}_{5} three asymmetric stretching vibrations are present around 2800–3000 cm^{−1}, a rocking vibration at 1300 cm^{−1}, and a bending vibration at 1100 1300 cm^{−1}.

== Preparation ==
Methanium can be prepared from methane by the action of very strong acids, such as fluoroantimonic acid (antimony pentafluoride SbF_{5} in hydrogen fluoride HF).

At about 270 Pa of pressure and ambient temperature, the methane ion CH^{+}_{4} will react with neutral methane to yield methanium and a methyl radical:

CH_{4}•^{+} + CH_{4} → CH^{+}_{5} + CH_{3}•

The methanium ion can also be made in the gas phase via the reaction of methane and an H^{+} ion (i.e. a proton).

CH_{4} + H^{+}(g) → CH^{+}_{5}

== Stability and reactions ==
The cations obtained by reaction of methane with SbF_{5} + HF, including methanium, are stabilized by interactions with the HF molecules.

At low pressures (around 1 mmHg) and ambient temperatures, methanium is unreactive towards neutral methane.

== See also ==
- Methenium
- Ammonium
- Ethanium
