= Armilenium =

Names
- IUPAC name 1,2,4a,5,6,8a-Hexahydro-1,2,5-methenonaphthalen-6-ylium
- Other names [3.5.3]Armilenium; 9-Tetracyclo[5.4.0.0^{4,5}.0^{3,8}]undeca-5,10-dienyl cation

Identifiers
CAS Number	41946-89-8
3D model (JSmol)	Interactive image
PubChem CID	12662406
CompTox Dashboard (EPA)	DTXSID501319421
- InChI: InChI=1S/C11H11/c1-2-7-6-4-5-9-10(7)11(9)8(6)3-1/h1-11H/q+1 Key: YHLLCJAAILLOIR-UHFFFAOYSA-N
- SMILES: C1=CC2C3C=CC4C2C4C3[CH+]1

Properties
Chemical formula	C_{11}H_{11}^{+}
Molar mass	143.208 g·mol^{−1}
- Except where otherwise noted, data are given for materials in their standard state (at 25 °C [77 °F], 100 kPa). Infobox references

Armilenium is a C_{11}H^{+}_{11} carbocation and was originally proposed as the first entirely organic sandwich compound. Named for its resemblance to an armillary sphere, NMR evidence for the carbocation was first described by Melvin J. Goldstein and Stanley A. Klein at Cornell University in 1973. In subsequent ^{13}C NMR experiments by Goldstein and Joseph P. Dinnocenzo in 1984, the C_{11}H^{+}_{11} carbocation was generated under stable ion conditions at lower temperature and at higher magnetic field than previously possible. These experiments revealed the carbocation to be fluxional. Fitting of the dynamic NMR process ruled out the sandwich species even as an intermediate in the 20-fold degenerate rearrangement of the carbocation.
