= Hayashi rearrangement =

Chemical reaction

The Hayashi rearrangement is the chemical reaction of ortho-benzoylbenzoic acids catalyzed by sulfuric acid or phosphorus pentoxide.

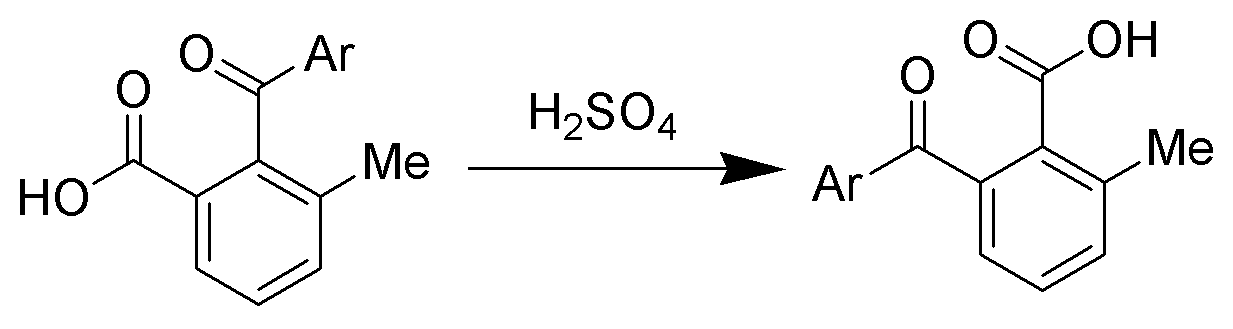
The Hayashi rearrangement

This reaction proceeds through electrophilic acylium ion attack with a spiro intermediate.
