= Koch reaction =

The Koch reaction is an organic reaction for the synthesis of tertiary carboxylic acids from alcohols or alkenes and carbon monoxide. Some commonly industrially produced Koch acids include pivalic acid, 2,2-dimethylbutyric acid and 2,2-dimethylpentanoic acid. The Koch reaction employs carbon monoxide as a reagent and can therefore be classified as a carbonylation. The carbonylated product is converted to a carboxylic acid, so in this respect the Koch reaction can also be classified as a carboxylation.

== Substrate scope and applications ==
Pivalic acid is produced from isobutene using the Koch reaction, as well as several other branched carboxylic acids. An estimated 150,000 tonnes of "Koch acids" and their derivatives annually.

Koch–Haaf-type reactions have been used to carboxylate adamantanes.

== Conditions ==
The reaction is a strongly acid-catalyzed carbonylation and typically proceeds under pressures of CO and at elevated temperatures. The commercially important synthesis of pivalic acid from isobutenes operates near 50 °C and 50 kPa (50 atm). Generally the reaction is conducted with strong mineral acids such as sulfuric acid, HF, or phosphoric acid in combination with BF_{3}.

Formic acid, which readily decomposes to carbon monoxide in the presence of acids, can be used instead of carbon monoxide. This method is referred to as the Koch–Haaf reaction. This variation allows for reactions at nearly standard room temperature and pressure.

== Mechanism ==
The mechanism has been intensively scrutinized. The mechanism involves generation of a tertiary carbenium ion, which binds carbon monoxide. The resulting acylium ion is then hydrolysed to the tertiary carboxylic acid:

R_{3}C^{+} + CO → R_{3}CCO^{+}
R_{3}CCO^{+} + H_{2}O → R_{3}CCO_{2}H + H^{+}

The carbenium ion can be produced either by protonation of an alkene or protonation/elimination of a tertiary alcohol:

R_{2}C=CH_{2} + H^{+} → (CH_{3})R_{2}C^{+}
R_{3}COH + H^{+} → R_{3}C^{+} + H_{2}O

== Catalyst usage and variations ==
Standard acid catalysts are sulfuric acid or a mixture of BF_{3} and HF.

Although the use of acidic ionic liquids for the Koch reaction requires relatively high temperatures and pressures (8 MPa and 430 K in one 2006 study), acidic ionic solutions themselves can be reused with only a very slight decrease in yield, and the reactions can be carried out biphasically to ensure easy separation of products. A large number of transition metal catalyst carbonyl cations have also been investigated for usage in Koch-like reactions: Cu(I), Au(I) and Pd(I) carbonyl cations catalysts dissolved in sulfuric acid can allow the reaction to progress at room temperature and atmospheric pressure. Usage of a Nickel tetracarbonyl catalyst with CO and water as a nucleophile is known as the Reppe carbonylation, and there are many variations on this type of metal-mediated carbonylation used in industry, particularly those used by Monsanto and the Cativa processes, which convert methanol to acetic acid using acid catalysts and carbon monoxide in the presence of metal catalysts.

Because of the use of strong mineral acids, industrial implementation of the Koch reaction is complicated by equipment corrosion, separation procedures for products and difficulty in managing large amounts of waste acid. Several acid resins and acidic ionic liquids have been investigated in order to discover if Koch acids can be synthesized in more mild environments.

== Side reactions ==
Koch reactions can involve a large number of side products, although high yields are generally possible (Koch and Haaf reported yields of over 80% for several alcohols in their 1958 paper). Carbocation rearrangements, etherization (in case an alcohol is used as a substrate, instead of an alkene), and occasionally substrate C_{N+1} carboxylic acids are observed due to fragmentation and dimerization of carbon monoxide-derived carbenium ions, especially since each step of the reaction is reversible. Alkyl sulfuric acids are also known to be possible side products, but are usually eliminated by the excess sulfuric acid used.

== See also ==
- Hydroformylation - related reaction of alkenes and CO to form aldehydes
- Gattermann–Koch reaction, arenes are converted to benzaldehyde derivatives in the presence of CO, AlCl_{3}, and HCl.
