= Methenium =

Ion of carbon with three hydrogens

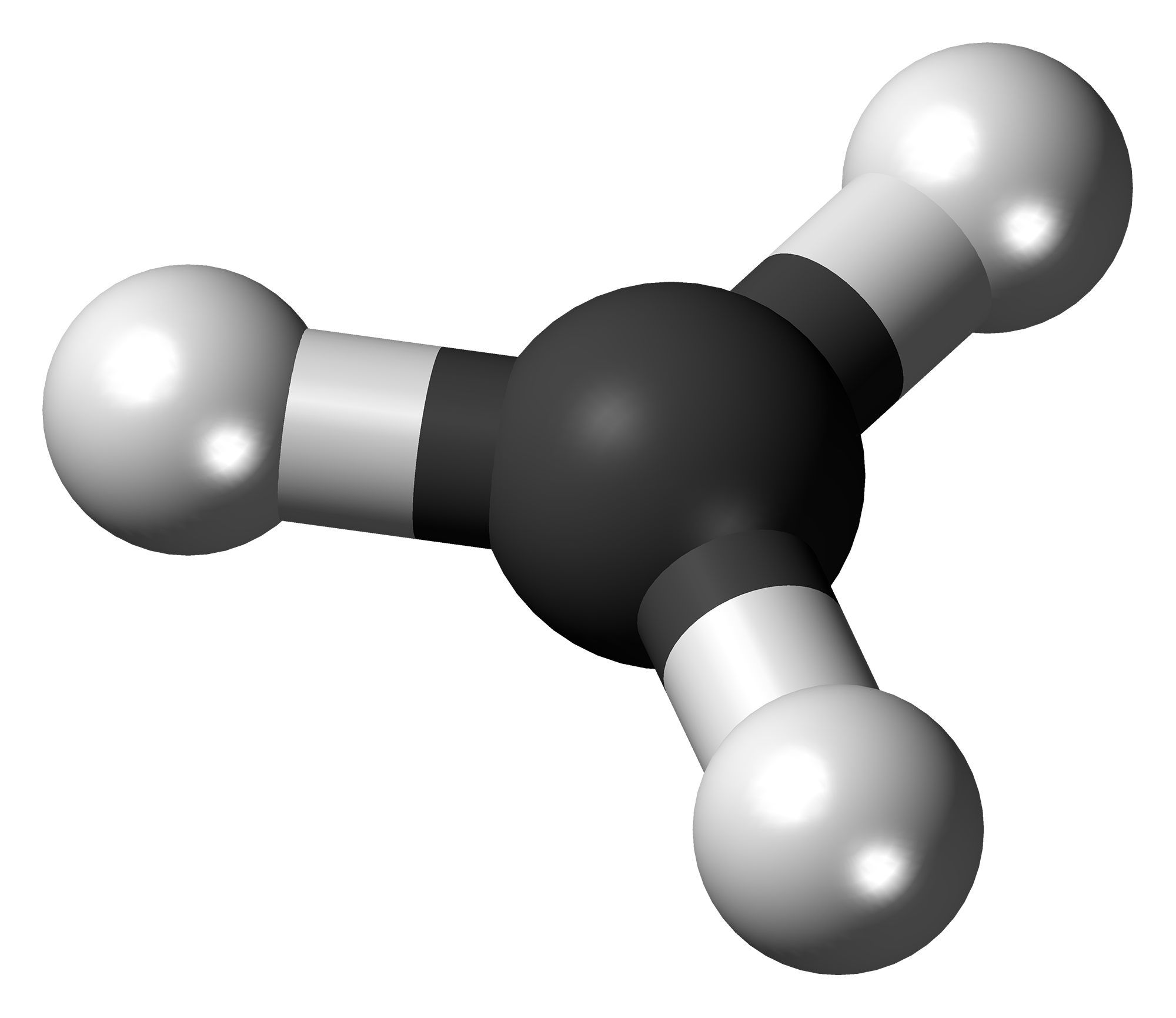

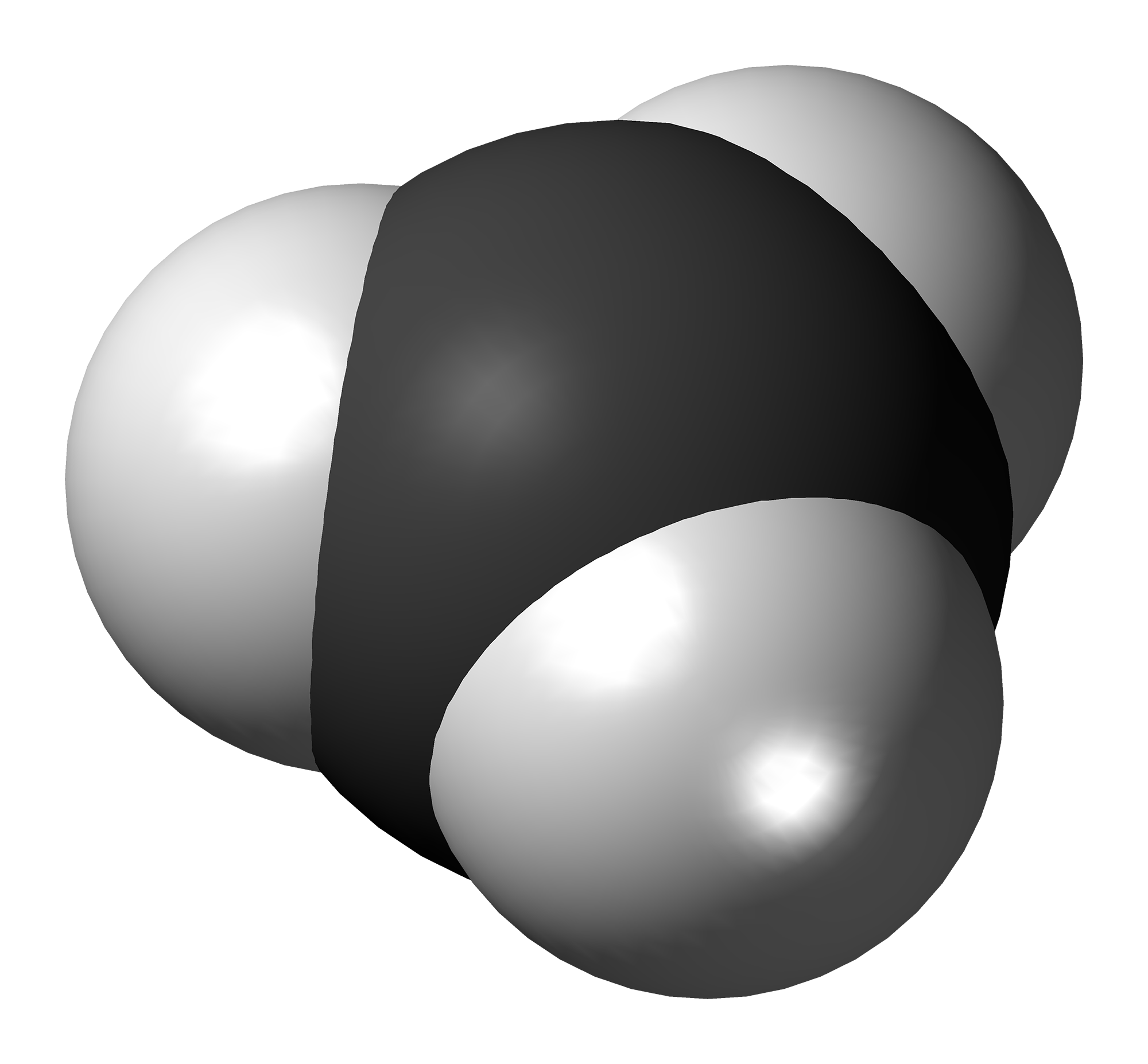

Names
- Preferred IUPAC name Methylium
- Other names Methyl cation; Carbanylium

Identifiers
CAS Number	14531-53-4
3D model (JSmol)	Interactive image
Beilstein Reference	1839325
ChEBI	CHEBI:29437
ChemSpider	559136
Gmelin Reference	48893
PubChem CID	644094
UNII	IM9JMM7N0Y
CompTox Dashboard (EPA)	DTXSID301319120
- InChI: InChI=1S/CH3/h1H3/q+1 Key: JUHDUIDUEUEQND-UHFFFAOYSA-N
- SMILES: [CH3+]

Properties
Chemical formula	CH_{3}^{+}
Molar mass	15.034 g·mol^{−1}

Related compounds
Related isoelectronic	borane
- Except where otherwise noted, data are given for materials in their standard state (at 25 °C [77 °F], 100 kPa). Infobox references

In organic chemistry, methenium (also called methylium, carbenium, methyl cation, or protonated methylene) is a cation with the formula CH^{+}_{3}. It can be viewed as a methylene radical (:CH_{2}) with an added proton (H^{+}), or as a methyl radical (•CH_{3}) with one electron removed. It is a carbocation and an enium ion, making it the simplest of the carbenium ions.

== Structure ==
Experiments and calculations generally agree that the methenium ion is planar, with threefold symmetry. The carbon atom is a prototypical (and exact) example of sp^{2} hybridization.

== Preparation and reactions ==
For mass spectrometry studies at low pressure, methenium can be obtained by ultraviolet photoionization of methyl radical, or by collisions of monatomic cations such as C^{+} and Kr^{+} with neutral methane. In such conditions, it will react with acetonitrile CH_{3}CN to form the ion (CH_{3})_{2}CN^{+}.

Upon capture of a low-energy electron (less than 1 eV), it will spontaneously dissociate.

It is seldom encountered as an intermediate in the condensed phase. It is proposed as a reactive intermediate that forms upon protonation or hydride abstraction of methane with FSO_{3}H-SbF_{5}. The methenium ion is very reactive, even towards alkanes.

== Detection ==
=== Origins of life ===
In June 2023, astronomers detected, for the first time outside the Solar System, methyl cation, CH_{3}^{+} (and/or carbon cation, C^{+}), the known basic ingredients of life, in interstellar space.

== See also ==
- Ammonium
- Ethanium
- Methanium
