= Three-center two-electron bond =

Electron-deficient chemical bond where three atoms share two electrons

A three-center two-electron (3c–2e) bond is an electron-deficient chemical bond where three atoms share two electrons. The combination of three atomic orbitals form three molecular orbitals: one bonding, one non-bonding, and one anti-bonding. The two electrons go into the bonding orbital, resulting in a net bonding effect and constituting a chemical bond among all three atoms. In many common bonds of this type, the bonding orbital is shifted towards two of the three atoms instead of being spread equally among all three. Example molecules with 3c–2e bonds are the trihydrogen cation (H^{+}_{3}) and diborane (B_{2}H_{6}). In these two structures, the three atoms in each 3c–2e bond form an angular geometry, leading to a bent bond.

== Boranes and carboranes ==
An extended version of the 3c–2e bond model features heavily in cluster compounds described by the polyhedral skeletal electron pair theory, such as boranes and carboranes. These molecules derive their stability from having a completely filled set of bonding molecular orbitals as outlined by Wade's rules.

The monomer BH_{3} is unstable since the boron atom has an empty p-orbital. A B−H−B 3-center-2-electron bond is formed when a boron atom shares electrons with a B−H bond on another boron atom. The two electrons (corresponding to one bond) in a B−H−B bonding molecular orbital are spread out across three internuclear spaces.

In diborane (B_{2}H_{6}), there are two such 3c–2e bonds: two H atoms bridge the two B atoms, leaving two additional H atoms in ordinary B−H bonds on each B. As a result, the molecule achieves stability since each B participates in a total of four bonds and all bonding molecular orbitals are filled, although two of the four bonds are 3-center B−H−B bonds. The reported bond order for each B−H interaction in a bridge is 0.5, so that the bridging B−H−B bonds are weaker and longer than the terminal B−H bonds, as shown by the bond lengths in the structural diagram.

Diborane. The two central hydrogen atoms are simultaneously bonded to both boron atoms in 3c–2e bonds.

== Transition metal complexes ==
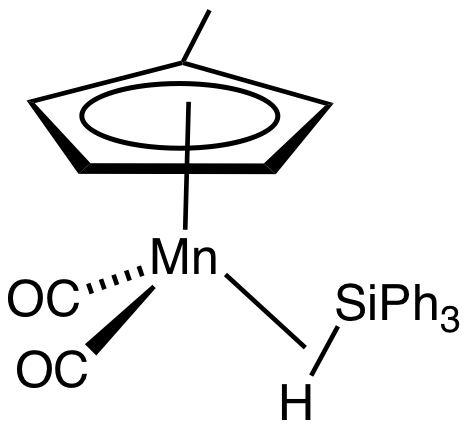
One of many transition metal silane complexes, examples feature three-center two-electron bonding.

Three-center, two-electron bonding is pervasive in organotransition metal chemistry. A celebrated family of compounds featuring such interactions is called agostic complexes.

== Other compounds ==
This bonding pattern is also seen in trimethylaluminium, which forms a dimer Al_{2}(CH_{3})_{6} with the carbon atoms of two of the methyl groups in bridging positions. This type of bond also occurs in carbon compounds, where it is sometimes referred to as hyperconjugation- another name for asymmetrical three-center two-electron bonds.

=== Beryllium ===
The first stable subvalent Be complex ever observed contains a three-center two-electron π-bond that consists of donor-acceptor interactions over the C-Be-C core of a Be(0)-carbene adduct.

=== Carbocations ===
Carbocation rearrangement reactions occur through three-center bond transition states. Because the three center bond structures have about the same energy as carbocations, there is generally virtually no activation energy for these rearrangements so they occur with extraordinarily high rates.

Carbonium ions such as ethanium C_{2}H^{+}_{7} have three-center two-electron bonds. Perhaps the best known and studied structure of this sort is the 2-Norbornyl cation.

== See also ==
- Three-center four-electron bond
- 2-Norbornyl cation
- Dihydrogen complex
