= Carbonium ion =

Any cation that has a pentavalent carbon atom

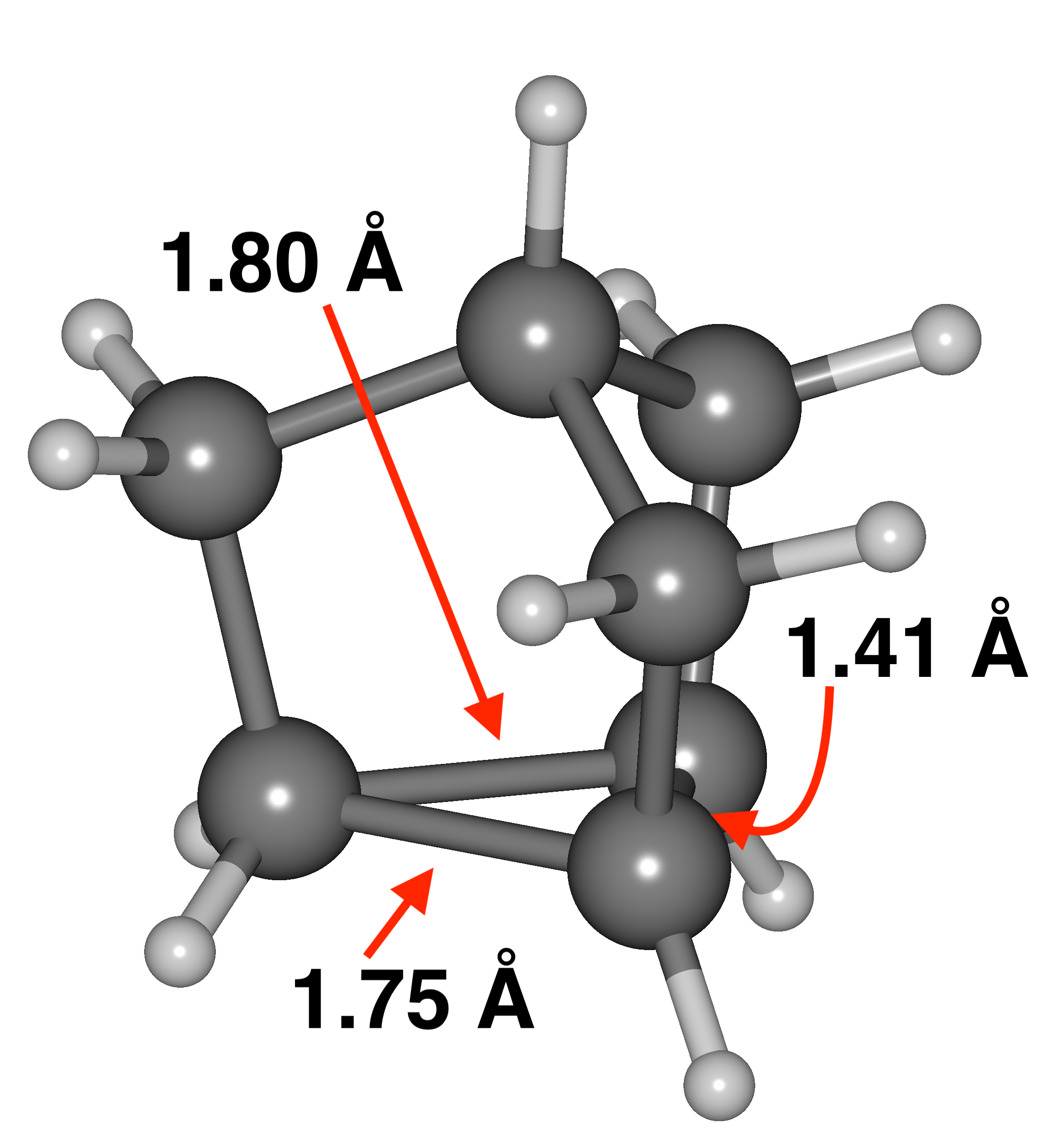
Structure of the 2-norbornyl cation based on X-ray crystallography. All other C-C bond lengths are normal (ca. 1.5 Å).

In chemistry, a carbonium ion is a cation that has a pentacoordinated carbon atom. They are a type of carbocation. In older literature, the name "carbonium ion" was used for what is today called carbenium. Carbonium ions' charge is delocalized in three-center, two-electron bonds. The more stable members are often bi- or polycyclic.

== 2-Norbornyl cation ==
The 2-norbornyl cation is one of the best-characterized carbonium ions. It is the prototype for non-classical ions. As indicated first by low-temperature NMR spectroscopy and confirmed by X-ray crystallography, it has a symmetric structure with an RCH_{2}^{+} group bonded to an alkene group, stabilized by a bicyclic structure.

== Cyclopropylmethyl cation ==
A non-classical structure for C_{4}H^{+}_{7} is supported by substantial experimental evidence from solvolysis experiments and NMR studies. One or both of two structures, the cyclopropylcarbinyl cation and the bicyclobutonium cation, were invoked to account for the observed reactivity. The NMR spectrum consists of two ^{13}C NMR signals, even at temperatures as low as −132 °C. Computations suggest that the energetic landscape of the C_{4}H^{+}_{7} system is very flat. The bicyclobutonium structure is computed to be 0.4 kcal/mol more stable than the cyclopropylcarbinyl structure. In the solution phase (SbF_{5}·SO_{2}ClF·SO_{2}F_{2}, with SbF^{–}_{6} as the counterion), the bicyclobutonium structure predominates over the cyclopropylcarbinyl structure in a 84:16 ratio at −61 °C. Three other possible structures, two classical structures (the homoallyl cation and cyclobutyl cation) and a more highly delocalized non-classical structure (the tricyclobutonium ion), are less stable.

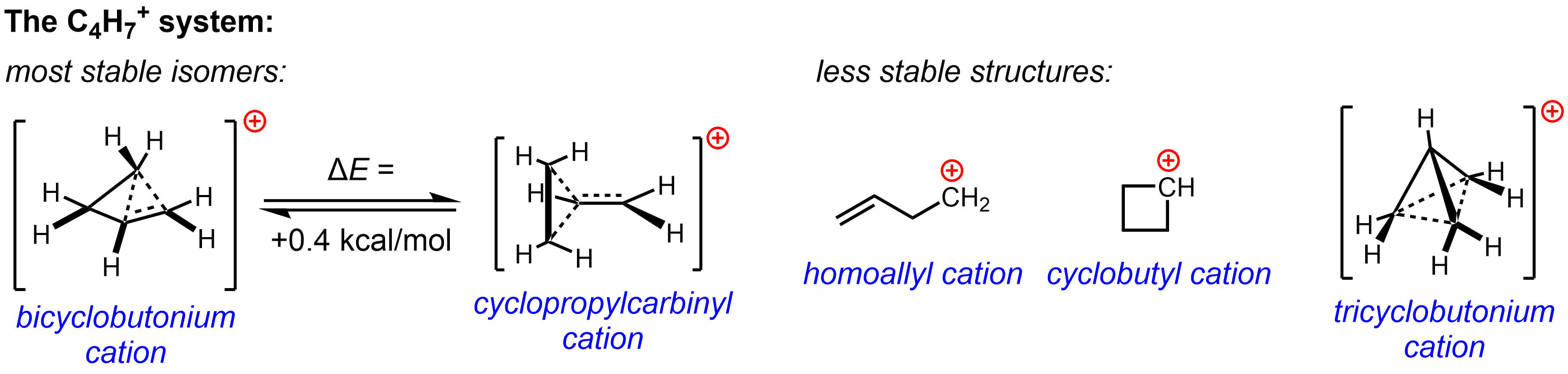

The low-temperature NMR spectrum of a dimethyl derivative shows two methyl signals, indicating that the molecular conformation of this cation is not perpendicular (as in A), which possesses a mirror plane, but is bisected (as in B) with the empty p-orbital parallel to the cyclopropyl ring system:

In terms of bent-bond theory, this preference is explained by assuming favorable orbital overlap between the filled cyclopropane bent bonds and the empty p-orbital.

== Methanium and ethanium ==
The simplest carbonium ions are also the least accessible. In methanium (CH^{+}_{5}), carbon is covalently bonded to five hydrogen atoms.

The ethanium ion C_{2}H^{+}_{7} has been characterized by infrared spectroscopy. The isomers of octonium (protonated octane, C_{8}H^{+}_{19}) have been studied.

== Pyramidal carbocations ==
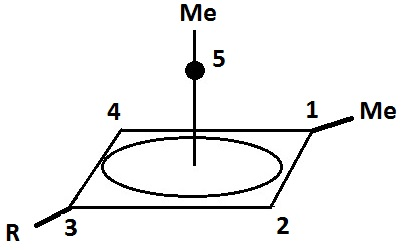
An example of the monovalent carbocation

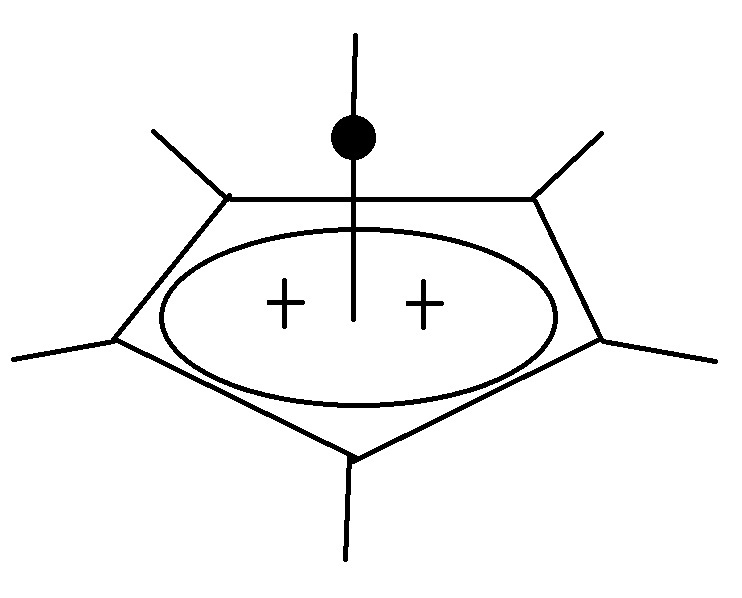
An example of the divalent carbocation

One class of carbonium ions are called pyramidal carbocations. In these ions, a single carbon atom hovers over a four- or five-sided polygon, in effect forming a pyramid. The square pyramidal ion will carry a charge of +1, the pentagonal pyramidal ion will carry +2.

X-ray crystallography confirms that hexamethylbenzene dication ([C_{6}(CH_{3})_{6}]^{2+}) is pentagonal-pyramidal.

== Applications ==
Carbonium ions are intermediates in the isomerization of alkanes catalyzed by very strong solid acids. Such carbonium ions are invoked in cracking (Haag-Dessau mechanism).

== See also ==
- The complex pentakis(triphenylphosphinegold(I))methanium (Ph_{3}PAu)_{5}C^{+}.
- Fluxional molecules
- More carbonium ions called non-classical ions are found in certain norbornyl systems.
- Onium compounds
- Carbenium ion
