= Trimethylselenonium iodide =

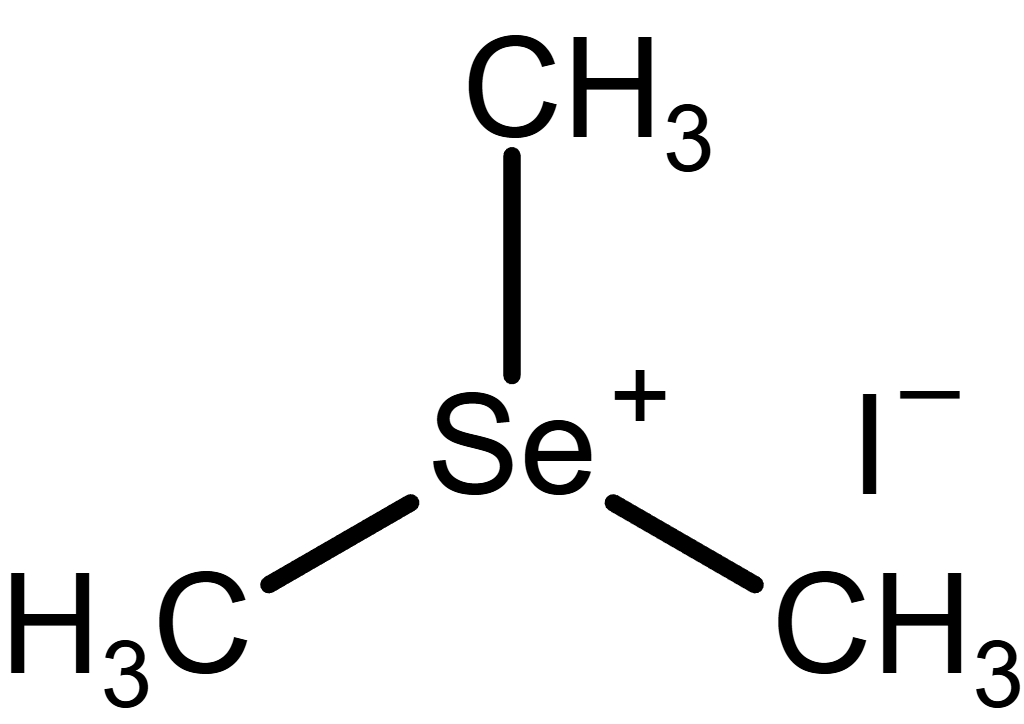

Names
- IUPAC name Trimethylselanium iodide

Identifiers
CAS Number	7362-34-7
3D model (JSmol)	Interactive image
ChemSpider	2282930
PubChem CID	3014561
CompTox Dashboard (EPA)	DTXSID70994402
- InChI: InChI=1S/C3H9Se.HI/c1-4(2)3;/h1-3H3;1H/q+1;/p-1 Key: BPBBRXLBVLKFKH-UHFFFAOYSA-M
- SMILES: C[Se+](C)C.[I-]

Properties
Chemical formula	[(CH_{3})_{3}Se]I
Molar mass	250.980 g·mol^{−1}
Appearance	White crystalline solid
Melting point	157.7 °C (315.9 °F; 430.8 K)

Structure
Crystal structure	Orthorombic
Molecular shape	Trigonal pyramidal at Se

Related compounds
Related compounds	Trimethylsulfonium iodide
- Except where otherwise noted, data are given for materials in their standard state (at 25 °C [77 °F], 100 kPa). Infobox references

Trimethylselenonium iodide is an ionic compound with the chemical formula [(CH_{3})_{3}Se]I. It is the selenium analogue of trimethylsulfonium iodide. It is white crystalline solid. Its structure is [(CH_{3})_{3}Se]^{+}I^{−}, consisting of trimethylselenonium cations [(CH_{3})_{3}Se]^{+} and iodide anions I^{−}.

== History ==
Trimethylselenonium iodide was the first known selenonium compound, discovered by Charles Loring Jackson during his early work on organoselenium compounds; its existence was predicted earlier by Auguste André Thomas Cahours.

== Preparation ==
Jackson's preparation of trimethylselenonium iodide used benzyl diselenide and methyl iodide. The reaction produced white crystals identified as trimethylselenonium iodide, with benzyl iodide and benzyldimethylselenonium triiodide as byproducts. Per Jackson, the reaction is:

(C_{6}H_{5}CH_{2})_{2}Se_{2} + 5 CH_{3}I → [(CH_{3})_{3}Se]^{+}I^{−} + [(C_{6}H_{5}CH_{2})(CH_{3})_{2}Se]^{+}[I_{3}]^{−} + C_{6}H_{5}CH_{2}I

It may also be prepared directly by methylation of dimethyl selenide by methyl iodide:

(CH_{3})_{2}Se + CH_{3}I → [(CH_{3})_{3}Se]^{+}I^{−}

This preparation is analogous to the production of trimethylsulfonium halides from dimethyl sulfide.

== Uses ==
Trimethylselenonium iodide is used as a primary standard compound in analytical method development and in basic and environmentally related studies.
