= Boranylium ions =

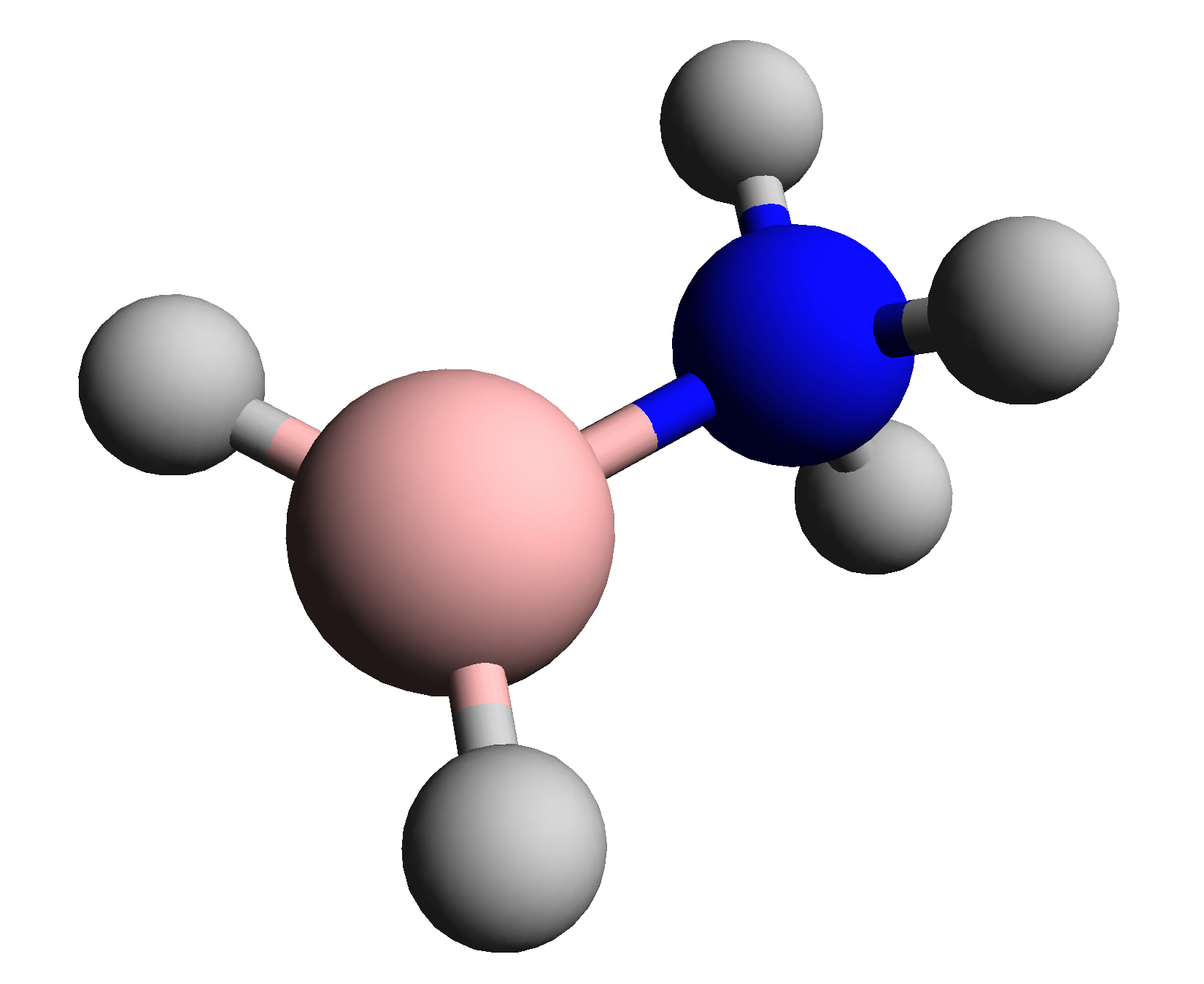
BH_{2}NH_{3}^{+} molecule, an example of a borenium cation, a type of boranylium ion with three ligands.

In chemistry, a boranylium ion is an inorganic cation with the chemical formula BR^{+}_{2}, where R represents a non-specific substituent. Being electron-deficient, boranylium ions form adducts with Lewis bases. Boranylium ions have historical names that depend on the number of coordinated ligands:

- [BR_{2}]^{+}: borinium
- [BR_{2}L]^{+}: borenium
- [BR_{2}L_{2}]^{+}: boronium

== Borenium ions ==
Various representations of bonding in borenium ions.

A borenium ion is an inorganic cation with the chemical formula [BR_{2}L]^{+}. In this class of molecules, the electron-deficient boron center has two valence electrons involved in sigma bonding with two ligands, while the third ligand is a two-electron donor such that the overall charge of the complex is +1. Depending on the nature of the ligands around the central boron, this positive charge can be localized on the boron center or delocalized across the entire molecule. Borenium ions can be made in a number of different ways and are of interest for applications in organic synthesis and catalysis.

=== Synthesis ===
Synthetic methods for preparing borenium ions include halide abstraction, nucleophilic dissociation, and protic addition to aminoboranes.

==== Halide or hydride abstraction ====
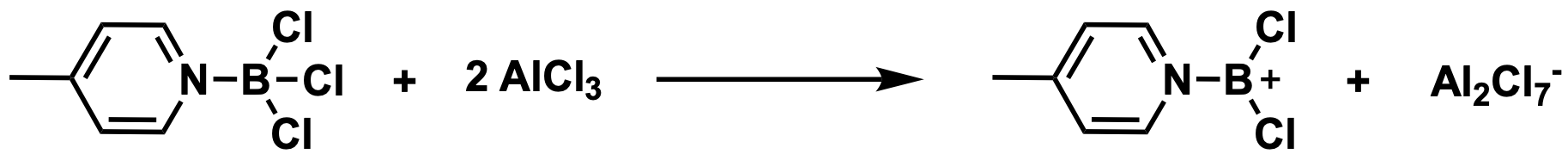
Synthetic method involving halide abstraction used by Ryschkewitsch and Wiggins to synthesize a borenium ion.

Borenium ions can be made from tetracoordinate Lewis acid-base adducts of boron halides. In this method, halide abstraction by a Lewis acid such as AlCl_{3} results in a borenium cation and AlCl_{4}^{−} anion. The first borenium ion to be isolated and characterized was made by Ryschkewitsch and Wiggins in 1970 using this method. They found that aluminium chloride dissolved in dichloromethane in the presence of the adduct of 4-methylpyridine and BCl_{3}. A positive charge on boron was then inferred from proton NMR spectroscopy.

Mechanism of halide abstraction used by Ryschkewitsch and Wiggins to synthesize the first borenium ion.

Similar to the halide abstraction method, borenium ions can be made through abstraction of a hydride from a tetracoordinate boron complex.

==== Nucleophilic dissociation ====
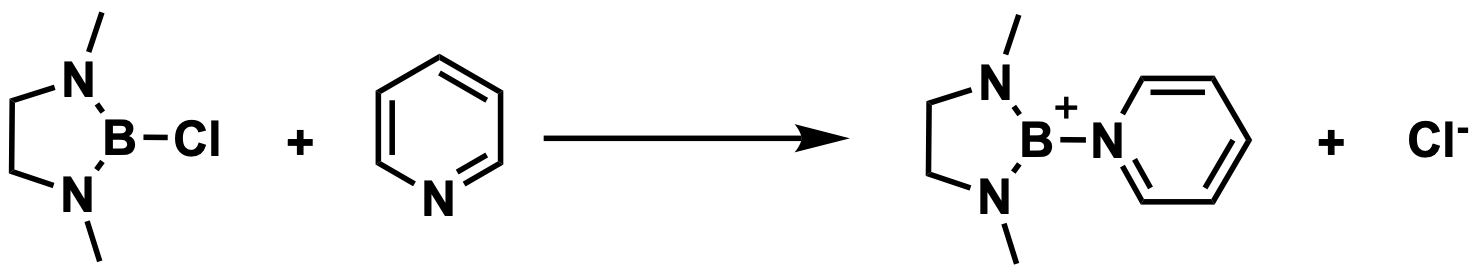
Example of the use of nucleophilic displacement to make a borenium ion.

Displacement of a ligand from a neutral tricoordinate boron halide by a neutral donor such as pyridine results in the generation of a borenium cation. For this reaction to yield the desired borenium cation, the ligand must be a good leaving group and the neutral donor must have enough steric bulk that nucleophilic dissociation is favored over Lewis acid-base adduct formation with the neutral BR_{3} starting material, as demonstrated by competition experiments.

==== Protic addition to aminoboranes ====
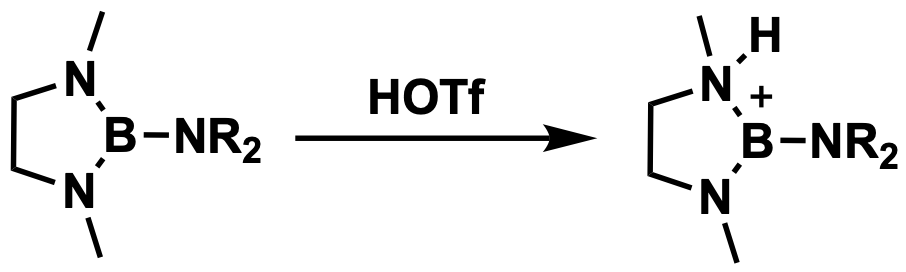
Formation of a borenium ion by protonation of an aminoborane

Aminoboranes can be protonated by various acids to make borenium ions. This synthetic method was developed in 1983 by Narula and Noth who used triflic acid to protonate 1,3-dimethyl-2-(dimethylamino)-1,3,2-diazaborolidine; however, they were unable to crystallize and structurally characterize this particular cation.

Protonation of non-Lewis acidic oxazaborolidines results in the generation of borenium ions that can be used as enantioselective Diels–Alder catalysts. These N-protonated borenium species have been characterized by NMR.

==== Other methods ====
Borenium ions can also be made through other methods such as the addition of base to a dicoordinate borinium ion or by metathesis with salts with weakly coordinating anions such as Ag[Al[OC(CF_{3})_{3}]_{4}] or Li[Al[OC(CF_{3})_{3}]_{4}].

=== Structure and electronics ===
A number of borenium ions have been structurally characterized through x-ray crystallography. The structures of borenium ions generally have two short bonds and one longer bond which is characteristic of a dative bond. The electron-deficient nature of the boron center of many borenium ions has been confirmed by computational and experimental studies. A Natural Population Analysis treatment of many borenium ions show that the boron center does indeed carry a significant positive charge. For example, the BH_{2}NH_{3}^{+} cation has a natural charge of +0.687 on boron.

Natural Bond Orbital analysis of a series of borenium ions calculated using the M06-2X level of theory and 6-311++G(d,p) basis set as described by Stojanovic and Stojanovic.
Borenium Ion	Natural Charge on B	Occupancy of B 2p Orbital
BH_{2}NH_{3}^{+}	+0.687	0.023
BCl_{2}NH_{3}^{+}	+0.566	0.460
B(CH_{3})_{2}NH_{3}^{+}	+1.087	0.167
BF_{2}NH_{3}^{+}	+1.412	0.289

Depending on the nature of the ligands around the central boron, this positive charge can be localized on the boron center or delocalized across the entire molecule. In some cases, pi-donating ligands arranged in the plane of the boron's empty p orbital can act to stabilize the electron deficiency of the boron. Density functional theory (DFT) calculations of isolable borenium ions show that the strongly Lewis acidic boron can be stabilized by pi-donation from aromatic substituents such as pyridine.

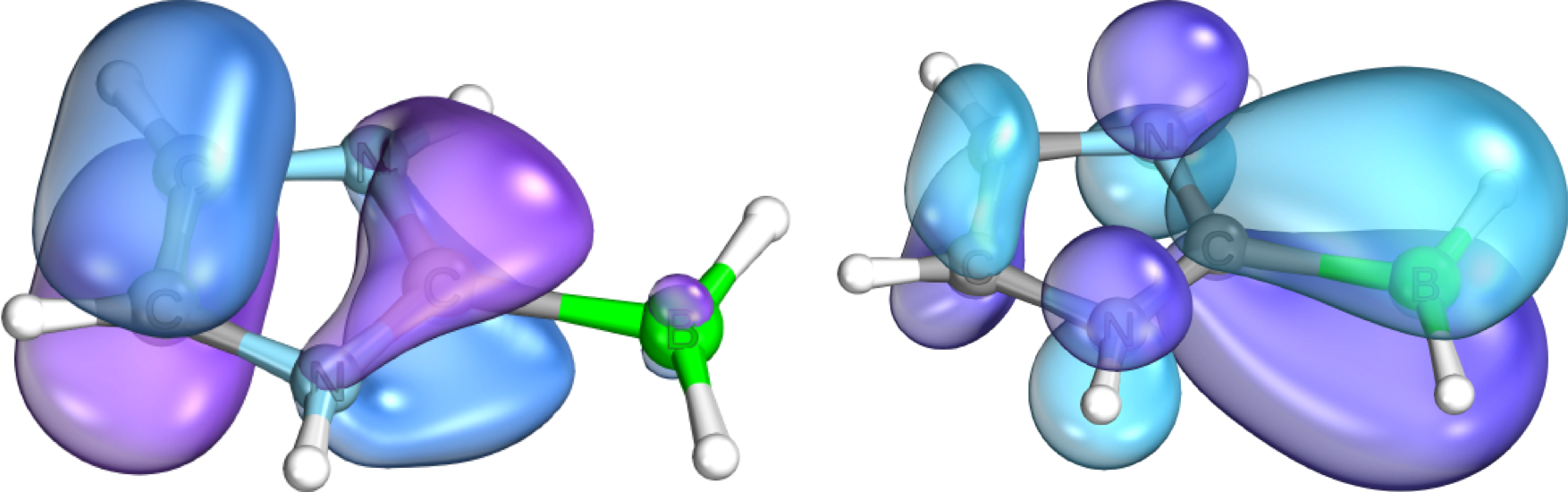
Contours of deformation density contributions from the pi orbitals of a NHC and BH_{2}^{+} fragment calculated as described by Rezabal and Frison in 2015. The left structure shows loss of electron density; the right structure shows gain of electron density.

N-heterocyclic carbenes (NHCs) can also be used to stabilize borenium ions through pi-conjugation, albeit acting as weaker pi-donors than neutral N-donors. The interaction energy between a BH_{2}^{+} fragment and various NHCs has been calculated using the extended transition state method for energy decomposition analysis combined with the natural orbitals for chemical valence (NOCV) theory. This analysis showed a net pi-donating effect of the NHC ligand – in this case, the positive charge is delocalized over the entire pi system rather than localized on the boron.

In other cases the dative ligand has been observed to be twisted out of the BR_{3} plane due to steric crowding. This nonplanar geometry leads to a reduction in pi-donation to the boron center, making it even more electron-deficient. It has been found that increased localization of charge on the boron increases the Lewis acidity of the borocation. The Gutmann–Beckett method has been used by many researchers in this field to benchmark the Lewis acidities of these cations.

Early crystal structures of borenium cations indicate that the corresponding anion is non-coordinating. Further studies have shown that the reactivity of borocations is highly tied to the identity of its counter ion. In catalytic applications, weakly coordinating anions have allowed for the most active borenium catalysts. A commonly used counter ion for borenium cations is tetrakis(pentafluorophenyl)borate, B(C_{6}F_{5})_{4}^{−}; however, other counterions such as AlCl_{4}^{−}, halides, and triflate are also possible. The synthetic viability of a borenium ion is often determined by its reactivity relative to its counterion. Halides are often unable to stabilize borenium ions, preferring instead to coordinate to the boron center to make a tetracoordinate species. A systematic evaluation of counterion effects on the synthetic viability of NHC-dicholoroborenium ions was conducted by Muthaiah and coworkers in 2013.

=== Reactivity and applications ===
Borenium ions are highly Lewis acidic. Their Lewis acidity is of the boron atom is determined by the electronic and steric effects of its ligands.

==== Hydrogen activation and FLP chemistry ====
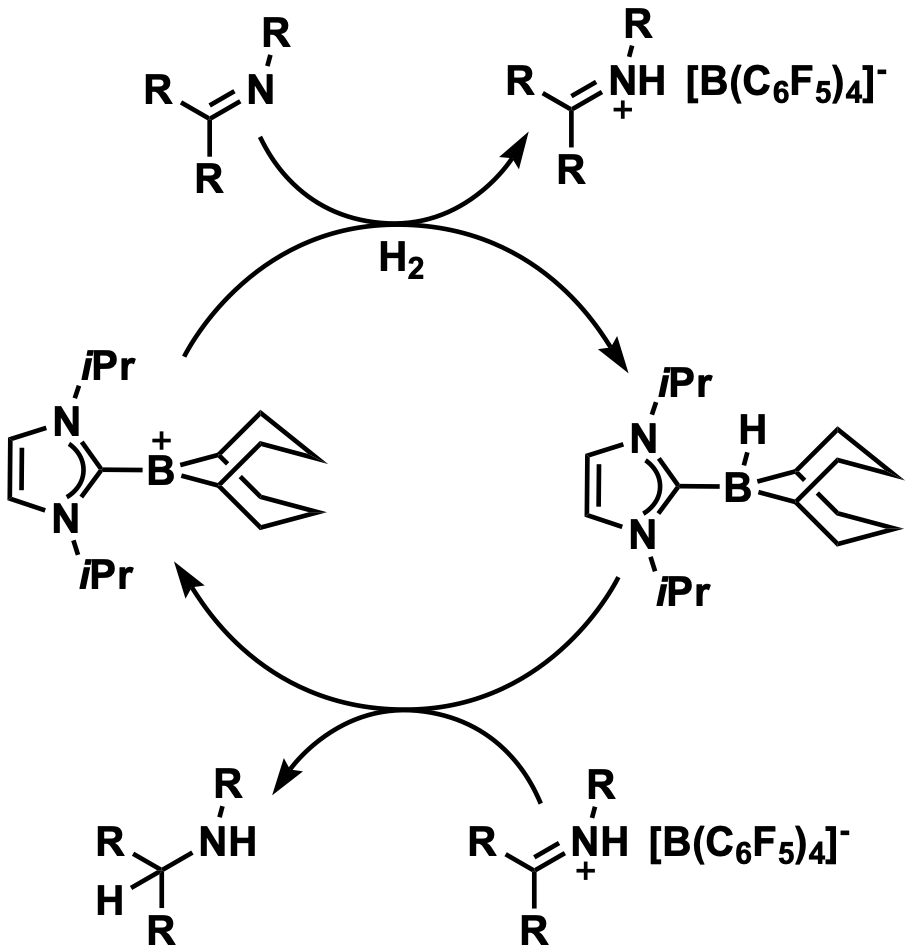
Catalytic cycle for the hydrogenation of imines facilitated by a NHC-stabilized borenium catalyst.

N-heterocyclic carbene (NHC)-stabilized borenium ions have been demonstrated to be potent metal-free H_{2} activation and hydrogenation catalysts. Unlike the neutral boranes typically used in frustrated Lewis pair (FLP) chemistry of this type, borenium ions are inherently electrophilic and do not require electron-withdrawing ligands to perform these small-molecule activations. Because electron-withdrawing substituents can hamper hydride delivery during hydrogenation catalysis, borenium ions can be more potent catalysts than neutral boron species because they are effective hydride donors. Indeed, in 2012, Stephan and coworkers were able to develop a borenium-based FLP system capable of activating H_{2} stoichiometrically in the presence of phosphine.

In 2015, Devillard et al. synthesized a naphthyl-bridged intramolecular borenium-containing FLP capable of activating H_{2} with concomitant hydrogenolysis of a mesityl ligand. A second-order perturbation theory analysis of the natural bond orbitals (NBOs) of the intermediate in this reaction involved with H_{2} activation showed a 281.8 kcal/mol interaction between the sigma bond of H_{2} and the 2p orbital of the cationic boron.

Borenium ions have also been used catalytically for various hydrogenations. Stephan and coworkers were able to use a borenium ion catalyst to activate H_{2} catalytically to be used for imine hydrogenation. A similar NHC-stabilized borenium ion was used to catalyze the enantioselective reduction of ketimines. In this example, enantioselectivity was afforded through the use of a chiral NHC ligand.

It has been shown that the steric and electronic properties of the NHC ligand used in these borenium catalysts is of great importance to catalytic activity: NHCs that were too bulky prevented intermolecular hydride delivery and ligands that were highly electron donating weakened the borenium cation's ability to act as a Lewis acid.

==== Enantioselective catalysis ====
Borenium ions have been used as metal-free enantioselective catalysts for a number of organic transformations. An early example of such is the Corey–Itsuno reduction. One proposed mechanism for this enantioselective reduction involves the in situ generation of a borenium-like species using BH_{3} as a Lewis acid.

Further work on borenium ions generated from neutral oxazaborolidines has expanded the scope of their applications. In 2002, it was reported by E. J. Corey and coworkers that N-protonation of non-Lewis acidic oxazaborolidines results in the generation of borenium ions which can catalyze the enantioselective Diels–Alder reaction of 1,3-dienes with 2-methacrolein or 2-bromoacrolein. This particular borenium ion could be made in situ by protonating a neutral oxazaborolidine with triflic acid. Corey and coworkers suggest that the stereoselectivity of this reaction is a result of aldehyde-catalyst association in the pre-transition state which governs stereoselectivity. The use of borenium ions as Diels–Alder catalysts has been further extended to the use of borenium ionic liquids as catalysts for the Diels–Alder reaction by Matuszek et al. in 2017.

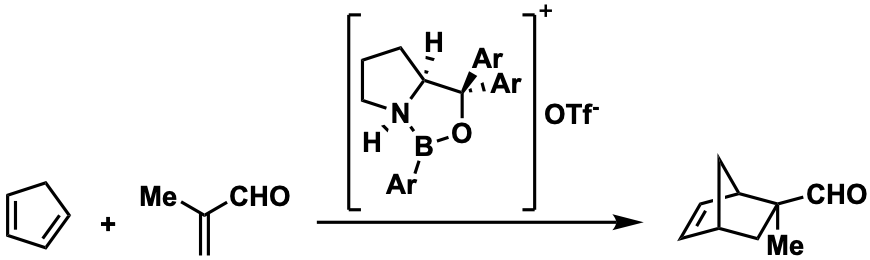
Enantioselective Diels–Alder reaction catalyzed by a borenium ion generated in situ by protonation with triflic acid.

==== Electrophilic aromatic borylation ====
Borenium ions have also been implicated as intermediates in electrophilic aromatic borylation reactions. In many examples of this reaction, a catalyst is used to activate a borane, producing a highly reactive borenium ion. The formation of this highly electrophilic species drives the formation of the Wheland intermediate, a key step in the electrophilic aromatic addition mechanism. wIn 2013, Stahl et al. used a ruthenium(II) thiolate catalyst to generate borenium ions capable of effecting direct borylation of nitrogen-containing heterocycles.

In 2017, Oestreich and coworkers developed a metal-free method for effecting this transformation. In their work, B(C_{6}H_{5})_{3} was used to activate catecholborane, generating a borenium ion capable of borylating various electron-rich heterocycles.

==== Hydroboration ====
The electrophilicity of borenium ions can drive the trans-hydroboration of alkynes. In 2016, McGough et al. were able to successfully accomplish metal-free trans-hydroboration with a variety of arylacetylene substrates using a borenium ion electrophile and B(C_{6}F_{5})_{3} as a catalyst.

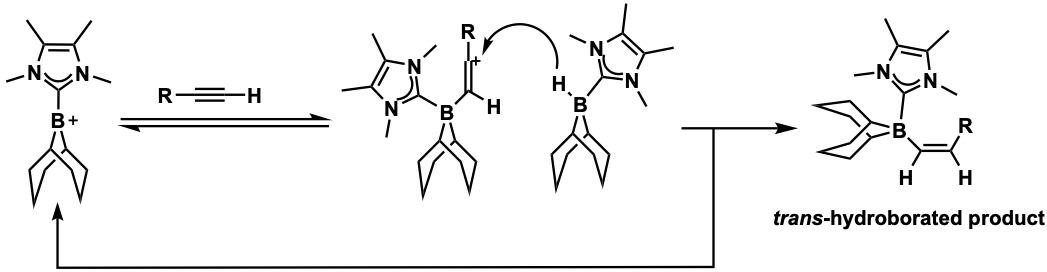
Mechanism of hydroboration with a borenium ion electrophile.

==== Polymerization catalysis ====
Borenium ions have been shown to form ionic liquids capable of catalyzing the polymerization of polyalphaolefins (PAOs). While not yet widely adopted by industry, this technology could provide an alternative to the use of BF_{3}, a toxic and corrosive gas, in the industrial synthesis of PAOs.

== Borinium cations ==
Borinium ions have the formula [BX_{2}]^{+}, where X^{−} is usual a bulky amide (R_{2}N^{−}). They have linear geometry at boron and are coordinatively unsaturated.

== Boronium cations ==
Boronium ions have the formula [L_{2}BR_{2}]^{+} (L = Lewis base). Boronium ions are tetrahedral and coordinatively saturated.

A well-known example is [(H_{3}N)_{2}BH_{2}]^{+}. Reaction of diborane with ammonia mainly gives [H_{2}B(NH_{3})_{2}]^{+}[BH_{4}]^{−} (diammoniodihydroboronium tetrahydroborate).

== Related boron cations ==
Other non-classical boron cations are mononuclear boron di- and tri-cations with formula [L_{3}BX]^{2+} and [L_{4}B]^{3+}, respectively.

Other reported boron cations are dibora-dications (bis(borenium) dications), some examples are depicted below.

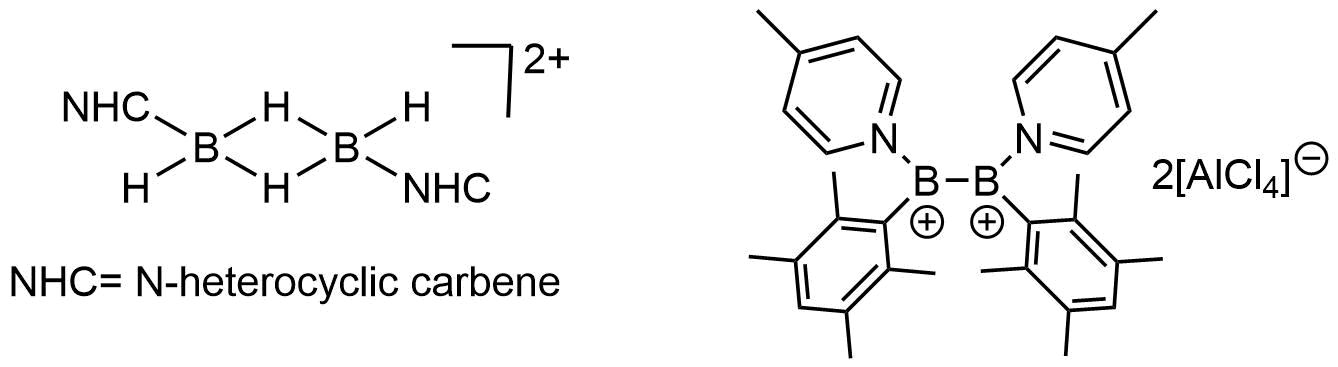
