= Victor Talrose =

Victor L. Talrose
- Victor Lvovich Talrose
- Born: April 15, 1922; Tula, Russia
- Died: June 22, 2004 (aged 82); Novato, California
- Education: Moscow State University
- Known for: Radical chemistry Mass spectrometry Chemical ionization
- Awards: Bourke Award (1963); USSR Academy of Science (1968); Lenin Prize; Thomson Medal (2003)
- Scientific career
- Fields: Radical chemistry Mass spectrometry
- Thesis: Ion-molecule reactions in gases (1962)

Victor Lvovich Talrose (Russian: Виктор Львович Тальрозе, April 15, 1922 – June 22, 2004) was a Russian scientist and mass spectrometrist. He was known as the “Father of Russian Mass Spectrometry” and was the author of 440 articles and 6 monographs.

== Early education ==
Victor Talrose was born in Tula, Russia, an industrial city on the Upa River 200 kilometers (120 mi) south of Moscow. He was the son of a medical doctor. He graduated from high school in 1939 with a gold medal for outstanding abilities.

He started his studies in chemistry at Moscow State University, but his studies were interrupted by the outbreak of World War II. Talrose served in the Soviet Army and was wounded and hospitalized three times. He returned to his studies in 1945, graduating in 1947.

== Radical reactions ==
He began work on his master's degree in the Laboratory of Elementary Processes headed by Viktor Kondrat’ev. His thesis was on the role of the hydroperoxyl radical in gas phase reactions of reaction of hydrogen and oxygen.

He became junior researcher at the Institute of Chemical Physics in Kondratyev lab, but was transferred to work on development of the Soviet atomic bomb project.

== Mass spectrometry ==
Talrose returned to Kondratyev lab after completion his work on the atomic bomb. He built the first Soviet mass spectrometer to study ion chemistry and in 1952 completed his Ph.D. thesis entitled ‘‘Secondary processes accompanying ionization of hydrocarbons and water in the ion sources of mass spectrometers.” He proposed that the ion at ‘’m/z’’ 17 was the hypervalent ion methanium, CH_{5}^{+}. This assignment was supported by accurate mass measurement and formed the basis for the later development of chemical ionization

From 1953 to 1956, Talrose worked on atomic weapons, then returned to the Kondratyev lab where headed a mass spectrometry group. He developed first Soviet gas chromatography–mass spectrometry and used it for some of the first use of selected ion monitoring for selective compound detection. He also developed gas phase ion chemistry bracketing techniques for determining proton affinity.

In 1959, he became head of a sector or the Chemical Physics institute for the study of free radicals and in 1962 received a D.Sc. for his thesis ‘‘Ion-molecule reactions in gases’. In 1963, he received the Bourke Award from the Royal Society of Chemistry.

== Chemical lasers ==
In 1964, Talrose began work on chemical lasers and in 1968, he was elected as a corresponding member of Russian Academy of Sciences. He received the Lenin Prize in 1984 for his work on chemical lasers.

== Institute director ==
1972 became deputy director of the Chemical Physics institute and in 1974 a special sector ‘‘Physical methods of stimulation of chemical reactions’’ was created with labs in Moscow and Chernogolovka. Talrose headed Moscow sector. In 1987, the sector became part of Institute of Energy Problems in Chemical Physics with Talrose as the director.

== Move to the United States ==
In 1997, he moved to the United States and began a collaboration with the mass spectrometry group at the University of California at San Francisco.

He received the International Mass Spectrometry Foundation Thomson Medal in 2003.
