= Carbenium ion =

Class of ions

The tert-butyl cation is a relatively stable carbenium ion.

A carbenium ion is a positive ion with the structure RR′R″C^{+}, that is a chemical species with carbon atom having only three covalent bonds, thus bearing a +1 formal charge. Carbenium ions are a major subset of carbocations, which is a general term for diamagnetic carbon-based cations. In parallel with carbenium ions is another subset of carbocations, the carbonium ions with the formula R_{5}^{+}. In carbenium ions, the charge is localized. They are isoelectronic with monoboranes such as B(CH_{3})_{3}.

== Reactivity ==
Carbenium ions are generally highly reactive due to having an incomplete octet of electrons; however, certain carbenium ions, such as the tropylium ion, are relatively stable due to the positive charge being delocalised between the carbon atoms.

=== Rearrangements ===
Carbenium ions sometimes rearrange readily. For example, when pentan-3-ol is heated with aqueous HCl, the initially formed 3-pentyl carbocation rearranges to a mixture of the 3-pentyl and 2-pentyl. These cations react with chloride ion to produce 3-chloropentane and 2-chloropentane in a ratio of approximately 1:2. Migration of an alkyl group to form a new carbocationic center is also observed. This often occurs with rate constants in excess of 10^{10} s^{−1} at ambient temperature and still takes place rapidly (compared to the NMR timescale) at temperatures as low as −120 °C (see Wagner-Meerwein shift). In especially favorable cases like the 2-norbornyl cation, hydrogen shifts may still take place at rates fast enough to interfere with X-ray crystallography at 86 K (−187 °C). Typically, carbocations will rearrange to give a tertiary isomer. For instance, all isomers of C_{6}H^{+}_{11} rapidly rearrange to give the 1-methyl-1-cyclopentyl cation. This fact often complicates synthetic pathways. For example, when 3-pentanol is heated with aqueous HCl, the initially formed 3-pentyl carbocation rearranges to a statistical mixture of the 3-pentyl and 2-pentyl. These cations react with chloride ion to produce about one third 3-chloropentane and two thirds 2-chloropentane. The Friedel–Crafts alkylation suffers from this limitation; for this reason, the acylation (followed by Wolff–Kishner or Clemmensen reduction to give the alkylated product) is more frequently applied.

=== As electrophiles ===
Carbocations are susceptible to attack by nucleophiles, like water, alcohols, carboxylates, azide, and halide ions, to form the addition product. Strongly basic nucleophiles, especially hindered ones, favor elimination over addition. Because even weak nucleophiles will react with carbocations, most can only be directly observed or isolated in non-nucleophilic media like superacids.

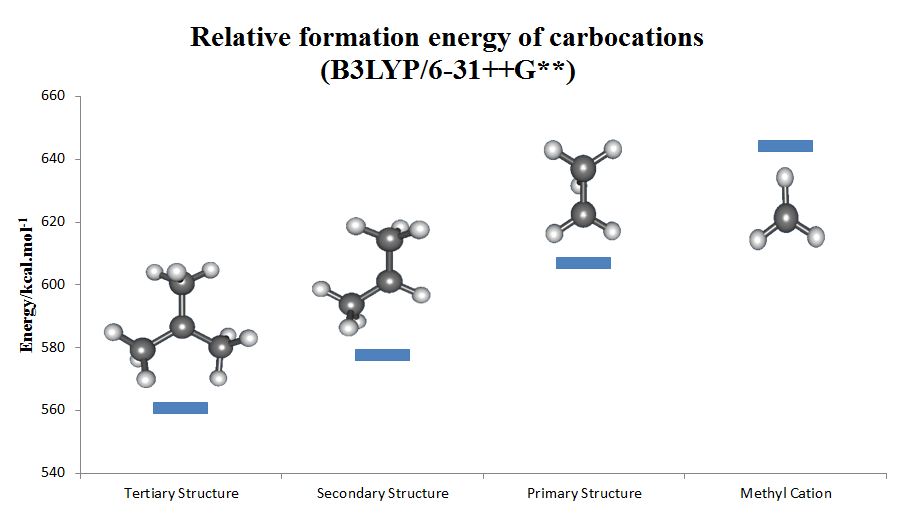
Relative formation energy of carbocations from computational calculation

== Types of carbenium ions ==
=== Stability ===
The stability order of carbocations, from most stable to least stable as reflected by hydride ion affinity (HIA) values, are as follows (HIA values in kcal/mol in parentheses):

Hydride ion affinity (HIA) as a measure of carbocation stability
Carbocation	c-C_{7}H^{+}_{7} (most stable)	(C_{6}H_{5})_{3}C^{+}	c-C_{3}H^{+}_{3}	(C_{6}H_{5})_{2}CH^{+}	2-norbornyl^{+}	t-C_{4}H^{+}_{9}	C_{6}H_{5}CH^{+}_{2}	i-C_{3}H^{+}_{7}
HIA (kcal/mol)	201	215	221	222	231	231	234	246
Carbocation	c-C_{3}H_{5}CH^{+}_{2}	CH_{2}=CH−CH^{+}_{2}	c-C_{5}H^{+}_{5}	CH≡C−CH^{+}_{2}	C_{2}H^{+}_{5}	C_{2}H^{+}_{3}	C_{6}H^{+}_{5}	CH^{+}_{3} (least stable)
HIA (kcal/mol)	249	256	258	270	273	287	298	312

Since carbenium ions can be highly reactive, a major consideration is their stability. The stability of carbenium ions correlates with the electron-donating properties of the substituents. Trialkylcarbenium ions, such as (CH_{3})_{3}C^{+}, are isolable as salts, but H_{3}C^{+} cannot. An analogous situation applies to triarylcarbenium ions: salts of triphenylcarbenium (C_{5}H_{5})_{3}C^{+} are readily isolable (see trityl), and those with amine substituents so robust that they are used as dyes, e.g. crystal violet. Carbenium ions can also be stabilized by conjugation to double bonds giving allyl cations, which enjoy some resonance stabilization. This situation is illustrated by the isolation of protonated benzene. Lone-pair bearing heteroatoms also stabilize carbenium ions.

=== Alkylium ions ===
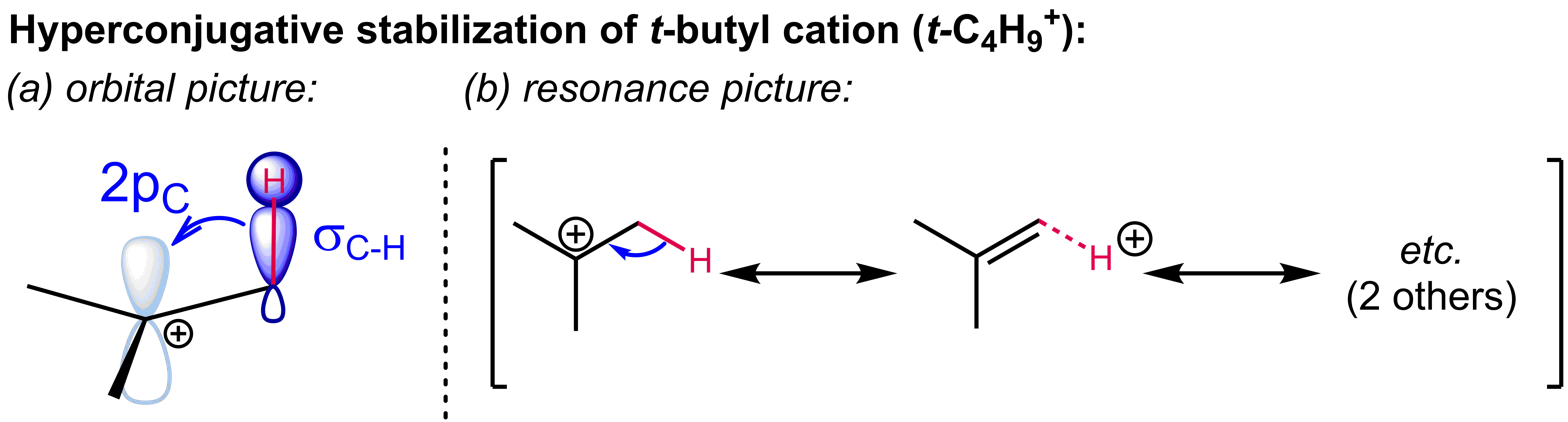
Hyperconjugation by neighboring alkyl groups stabilizes the t-butyl cation. The stabilizing interaction can be depicted as an orbital interaction or by resonance structures involving "no-bond" resonance forms. (For clarity, a dashed line is used to show that the hydrogen atom is still attached, although the formal C–H bond order in the hyperconjugative structure is zero.)

The stability of alkyl-substituted carbocations follows the order 3° > 2° > 1° > methyl. This trend can be inferred by the hydride ion affinity values (231, 246, 273, and 312 kcal/mol for (CH_{3})_{3}C^{+}, (CH_{3})_{2}CH^{+}, CH_{3}CH^{+}_{2}, and CH^{+}_{3}). The effect of alkyl substitution is a strong one:

- tertiary cations are stable and many are directly observable in superacid media. The stabilization by alkyl groups is explained by hyperconjugation. The donation of electron density from a β C-H or C-C bond into the unoccupied p orbital of the carbocation (a σ_{CH/CC} → p interaction) allows the positive charge to be delocalized.
- Secondary cations are usually transient. Only the isopropyl, s-butyl, and cyclopentyl cations have been observed in solution.
- Primary carbocations in the solution phase, even as transient intermediates (the ethyl cation has been proposed for reactions in 99.9% sulfuric acid and in FSO_{2}OH·SbF_{5}), and methyl cation has only been unambiguously identified in the gas phase. In most, if not all cases, the ground state of alleged primary carbenium ions consist of bridged structures in which positive charge is shared by two or more carbon atoms and are better described as side-protonated alkenes, edge-protonated cyclopropanes, or corner-protonated cyclopropanes rather than true primary cations. The simple ethyl cation, C_{2}H^{+}_{5} has been demonstrated experimentally and computationally to be bridged and can be thought of as a symmetrically protonated ethylene molecule. The same is true for higher homologues like 1-propyl and 1-butyl cations. Neopentyl derivatives are thought to ionize with concomitant migration of a methyl group (anchimeric assistance); thus, in most if not all cases, a discrete neopentyl cation is not believed to be involved.

Carbenium ions can be prepared directly from alkanes by removing a hydride anion, H^{−}, with a strong acid. (Equivalently, the corresponding carbonium ions tend to eliminate H_{2}.) For example, magic acid, a mixture of antimony pentafluoride (SbF_{5}) and fluorosulfuric acid (FSO_{3}H), turns isobutane into the trimethylcarbenium cation, (CH_{3})_{3}C^{+}.

Order of stability of examples of tertiary (III), secondary (II), and primary (I) alkylcarbenium ions, as well as the methyl cation (far right).

==== Extra stabilizing effects ====
A carbocation may be stabilized by resonance by a carbon–carbon double bond or by the lone pair of a heteroatom adjacent to the ionized carbon. The allyl cation CH_{2}=CH−CH^{+}_{2} and benzyl cation C_{6}H_{5}−CH^{+}_{2} are more stable than most other carbenium ions due to donation of electron density from π systems to the cationic center. The doubly- and triply-benzylic carbocations, diphenylcarbenium and triphenylcarbenium (trityl) cation, are particularly stable. For the same reasons, the partial p character of strained C–C bonds in cyclopropyl groups also allows for donation of electron density and stabilizes the cyclopropylmethyl (cyclopropylcarbinyl) cation.

Oxocarbenium and iminium ions have important secondary canonical forms (resonance structures) in which carbon bears a positive charge. As such, they are carbocations according to the IUPAC definition although some chemists do not regard them to be "true" carbocations, as their most important resonance contributors carry the formal positive charge on an oxygen or nitrogen atom, respectively.

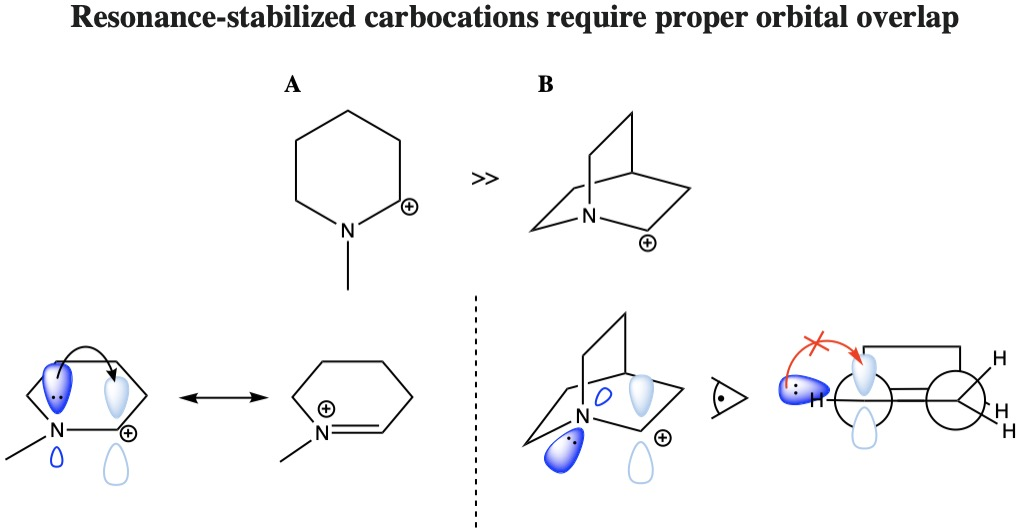
The sp2 lone pair of molecule A is oriented such that it forms sufficient orbital overlap with the empty p orbital of the carbonation to allow the formation of a π bond, sequestering the carbonation in a contributing resonance structure. The lone pair of molecule B is rotated 90° with respect to the empty p orbital of the carbonation, demonstrated by the Newman projection (bottom right). Without proper orbital overlap, the nitrogen lone pair cannot donate into the carbocation's empty p orbital. Thus, the carbocation in molecule B is not resonance-stabilized.

=== Aromatic carbenium ions ===
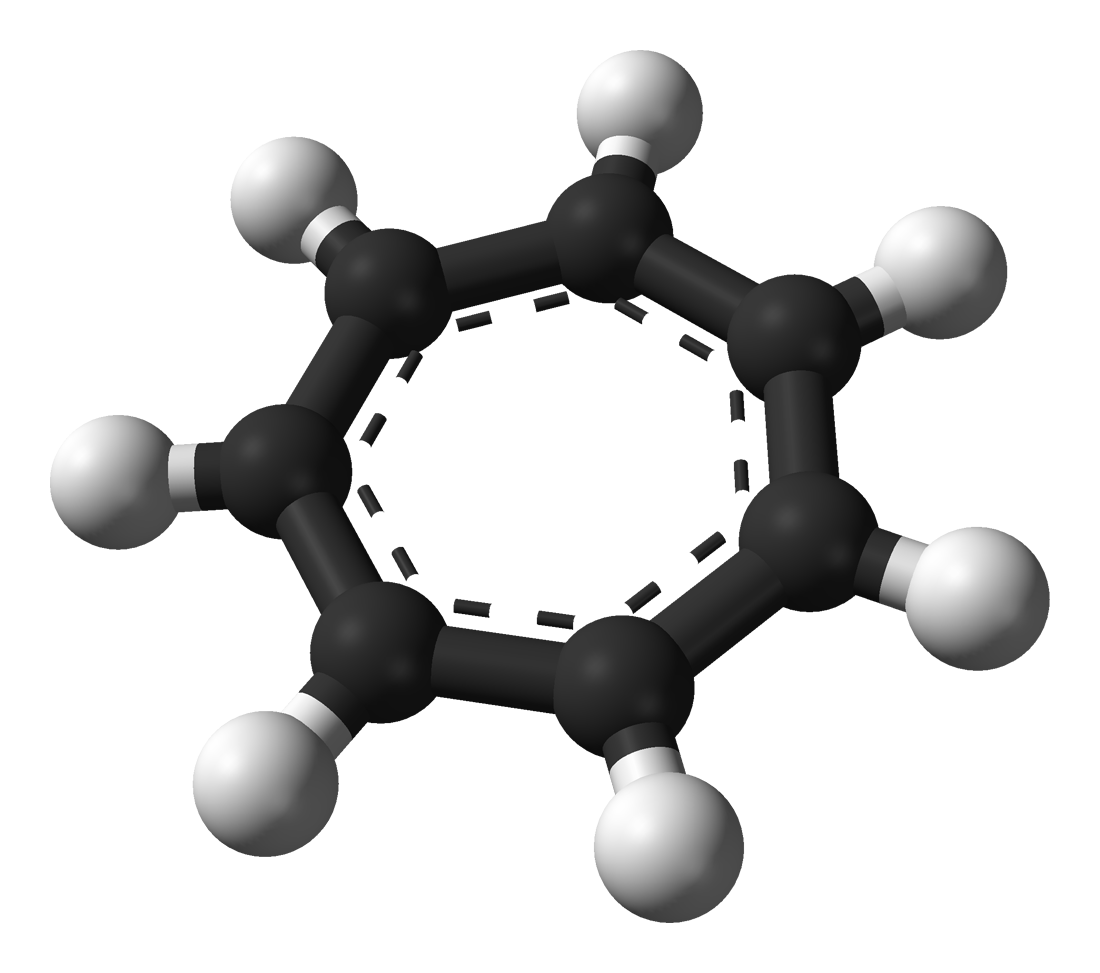
Ball-and-stick model of the tropylium cation

The tropylium ion is an aromatic species with the formula C_{7}H^{+}_{7}. Its name derives from the molecule tropine (itself named for the molecule atropine). Salts of the tropylium cation can be stable, e.g. tropylium tetrafluoroborate. It can be made from cycloheptatriene (tropylidene) and bromine or phosphorus pentachloride.

It is a planar, cyclic, heptagonal ion; it also has 6 π-electrons (4n + 2, where n = 1), which fulfills Hückel's rule of aromaticity. It can coordinate as a ligand to metal atoms.

The structure shown is a composite of seven resonance contributors in which each carbon carries part of the positive charge.

In 1891 G. Merling obtained a water-soluble salt from a reaction of cycloheptatriene and bromine. The structure was elucidated by Eggers Doering and Knox in 1954.

On the other hand, the antiaromatic cyclopentadienyl cation (C_{5}H^{+}_{5}) is destabilized by some 40 kcal/mol.

Another aromatic carbenium ion is the cyclopropenyl or cyclopropenium ion, C_{3}H^{+}_{3}. Although less stable than the tropylium cation, this carbenium ion can also form salts at room temperature. Solutions of such salts were exhibit conventional spectroscopic and chemical properties. The cyclopropenium cation (C_{3}H^{+}_{3}), although somewhat destabilized by angle strain, is still clearly stabilized by aromaticity when compared to its open-chain analog, allyl cation.

These varying cation stabilities, depending on the number of π electrons in the ring system, can furthermore be crucial factors in reaction kinetics. The formation of an aromatic carbocation is much faster than the formation of an anti-aromatic or open-chain carbocation.

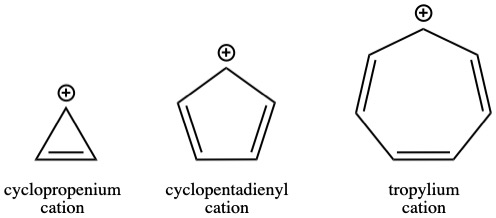

=== Arenium ions ===
An arenium ion is a cyclohexadienyl cation that appears as a reactive intermediate in electrophilic aromatic substitution. For historic reasons this complex is also called a Wheland intermediate, or a σ-complex.

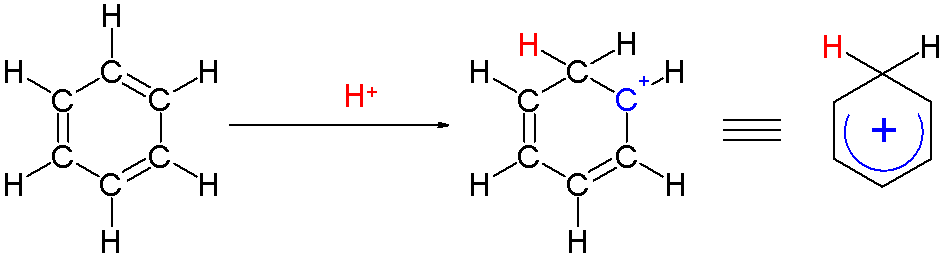

Two hydrogen atoms bonded to one carbon lie in a plane perpendicular to the benzene ring. The arenium ion is no longer an aromatic species; however it is relatively stable due to delocalization: the positive charge is delocalized over 5 carbon atoms. Also contributing to the stability of arenium ions is the energy gain resulting from the strong C-e bond (E = electrophile).

The smallest arenium ion is protonated benzene, C_{6}H^{+}_{7}. The benzenium ion can be isolated as a stable compound when benzene is protonated by the carborane superacid, H(CB_{11}H(CH_{3})_{5}Br_{6}). The benzenium salt is crystalline with thermal stability up to 150 °C. Bond lengths deduced from X-ray crystallography are consistent with a cyclohexadienyl cation structure.

=== Acylium ions ===
An acylium ion is a cation with the formula RCO^{+}. The structure is described as R−C≡O^{+} or R−=O. It is an acyl carbocation, but the actual structure has the oxygen and carbon linked by a triple bond. Such species are common reactive intermediates, for example, in the Friedel−Crafts acylations also in many other organic reactions such as the Hayashi rearrangement. Salts containing acylium ions can be generated by removal of the halide from acyl halides:

RCOCl + SbCl_{5} → RCO^{+}SbCl^{−}_{6}

The C–O distance in these cations is near 1.1 ångströms, even shorter than that in carbon monoxide. Acylium cations are characteristic fragments observed in EI-mass spectra of ketones.

=== Vinyl and alkynyl carbenium ions ===
Based on hydride ion affinity, the parent vinyl cation (HIA = 287kJ/mol) is less stable than even a primary carbocation (HIA = 266kJ/mol), while an α alkyl-substituted vinyl cation (HIA = 258kJ/mol) has a stability that is between a primary and secondary carbocation.

Hence, vinyl cations are relatively uncommon intermediates. They can be generated by the ionization of a vinyl electrophile, provided the leaving group is sufficiently good (e.g., TfO^{−}, IPh, or N_{2}). They have been implicated as intermediates in some vinyl substitution reactions (designated as S_{N}1(vinyl)) and as intermediates in the electrophilic addition reactions of arylalkynes. With the exception of the parent vinyl cation, which is believed to be a bridged species, and geometrically constrained cyclic vinyl cations, most vinyl cations take on sp hybridization and are linear.

Aryl cations are less stable than vinyl cations due to the ring-enforced distortion to a nonlinear geometry and approximately sp^{2}-character of the unoccupied orbital. Only N_{2} in aryldiazonium salts is a good enough leaving group for the chemical generation of aryl cations.

Alkynyl cations are extremely unstable, much less stable than even CH^{+}_{3} (hydride ion affinity 386 kcal/mol versus 312 kcal/mol for CH^{+}_{3}) and cannot be generated by purely chemical means. They can, however, be generated radiochemically via the beta decay of tritium:

$$\ce{RC#CT -> [RC#C^3 He]+ + e-} + \bar{\nu }_e \longrightarrow \ce{RC#C+ + ^{3}He + e-} + \bar{\nu }_e$$

== Selected applications ==
Fuchsine (hydrochloride salt), a commercial dye that contains a carbenium ion.

Carbenium ions are so integrated into organic chemistry that a full inventory of their commercially useful reactions would be long. For example, catalytic cracking, a major step in petroleum refining involves carbenium ion intermediates.

The alkylation of benzene with alpha-olefins to give linear alkylbenzene (LABs) illustrates the behaviour of secondary carbenium ions. The alkylation is initiated by strong acids. LABs are a key precursor to detergents.

Derivatives of the triphenylcarbenium are the triarylmethane dyes.

Acylium ions are intermediates in Friedel-Crafts acylations and Koch reactions.

== See also ==
- Borenium ion
- Nitrenium ion
