= Acylium ions =

In organic chemistry, acylium ions are cations with the formula RCO^{+}, where R = alkyl or aryl. They are a kind of carbocation.

== Structure, bonding, synthesis ==
Structural details of the acetyl cation.

In acylium ions, the C-C-O linkage is linear. The oxygen and the central carbon can be described as sp hybridized. A triple bond exists between C and O. Acylium ions can be viewed as C-alkylated derivatives of carbon monoxide (which also has a C-O triple bond). They are typically prepared by removal of chloride from acyl chlorides using strong Lewis acids such as antimony pentachloride.

Several acylium salts have been characterized by X-ray crystallography, including the propionyl and mesityl derivatives. Because acylium cation is highly electrophilic, its salts can only be isolated with weakly coordinating anions.

CH_{3}COCl + GaCl_{3} → CH_{3}CO^{+} + GaCl^{−}_{4}

Acetyl hexafluoroantimonate and hexachloroantimonate are other early examples.

The strength of the C≡O bond is indicated by the frequency of its vibration (ν_{CO}). These values are 2300 and 2200 cm^{−1}, respectively for the aryl and alkyl acylium ions. For comparison, the same vibration for carbon monoxide is 2143 cm^{−1}.

== Reactivity ==
Acylium ions are potent electrophiles as evidenced by their ability to attack arenes. Acylium ions are intermediates in several reactions, such as the Friedel-Crafts acylation of arenes by acetyl chloride in the presence of aluminium trichloride:

C_{6}H_{5}R + CH_{3}CO^{+} + AlCl^{−}_{4} → CH_{3}COC_{6}H_{4}R + HCl + AlCl_{3}

Such depictions may be simplistic because of ion-pairing between the acetyl cation (an acylium cation) and the tetrachloroaluminate.

The acylium ion derived from pivaloyl chloride is unusual because it exists in equilibrium with the tert-butyl cation:

(CH_{3})_{3}CCO^{+} ⇌ (CH_{3})_{3}C^{+} + CO

Likewise 1-adamantylcarbonylium decomposes to 1-adamantanium and carbon monoxide.

Central to the Koch carbonylation is the hydrolysis of acylium ions to carboxylic acids:

R_{3}CCO^{+} + H_{2}O → R_{3}CCO_{2}H + H^{+}
