= Ethanium =

Highly reactive positive ion

Ethanium (C_{2}H^{+}_{7})

In chemistry, ethanium or protonated ethane is a highly reactive positive ion with formula C_{2}H^{+}_{7}. It can be described as a molecule of ethane (C_{2}H_{6}) with one extra proton (hydrogen nucleus), that gives it a +1 electric charge.

Ethanium is one of the simplest carbonium ions (after methanium CH^{+}_{5}). It was first detected as a rarefied gas in 1960 by S. Wexler and N. Jesse. It easily dissociates into ethenium C_{2}H^{+}_{5} and molecular hydrogen H_{2}.

== Production ==
Ethanium was first detected by infrared spectroscopy among the ions produced by electrical discharges in rarefied methane or ethane gas.

Ethanium can also be produced by irradiating methane containing traces of ethane with an electron beam at low pressure (about 2 mmHg). The electron beam first creates methanium and methenium ions. The former rapidly transfer their proton to ethane:

CH^{+}_{5} + C_{2}H_{6} → CH_{4} + C_{2}H^{+}_{7}

The latter reaction is also observed when CH^{+}_{5}, N_{2}OH^{+} or HCO^{+} ions are injected into ethane at somewhat lower pressure.

== Stability and reactions ==
At about 1 mmHg and 30 °C, ethanium dissociates very slowly to ethenium and H_{2}, across an energy barrier of about 10 kcal/mol; the decomposition is considerably faster at 92 °C. The decomposition has been claimed to be nearly athermal but with 8 kcal/mol of free energy due to increase of entropy.

== Structure ==
Like its "unsaturated" relatives ethenium and ethynium C_{2}H^{+}_{3}, the ethanium ion was conjectured to have (at least momentarily) a proton bound simultaneously to the two carbon atoms, and the electrical charge evenly spread between them, as in other non-classical ions. The alternative "classical" structure would have the charge and the extra hydrogen bound to only one of the two atoms, i.e. a methylated methanium ion.

Earlier calculations had predicted that the energies of the two forms should be 4 to 12 kcal/mol lower than the dissociated state C_{2}H^{+}_{5} + H_{2}, and they should be separated by a slightly positive energy barrier. Gas-phase infrared spectroscopy by Yeh and others (1989) has shown that both forms are stable. The bridged structure has the lowest energy, 4 to 8 kcal/mol lower than the classical one.

Refined calculations by Obata and Hirao (1993) predict that the most stable form has three orthogonal planes of symmetry (C_{2v}) with the two CH_{3} subgroups in the eclipsed configuration (unlike ethane, whose ground state has the staggered configuration). Four "bottom" H atoms lie on a plane opposite to the bridging H atom and the other two "top" H atoms. The approximate computed distances are C–C 0.211 nm, C–H 0.124 nm (bridging), 0.107 nm (bottom) and 0.108 nm (top); the C–H–C angle at the bridge is about 116 degrees, the H–C–H angles are 116 degrees (bottom-bottom) and 114 degrees (bottom-top). However, there are other configurations with near-minimum energy, including one where the two CH_{3} subgroups are slightly staggered (with C_{s} symmetry), another where one of the carbons of a C_{2}H^{+}_{5} ion is loosely bound to an H_{2} molecule 0.250 nm away.

== See also ==
- Doubly protonated ethane C_{2}H^{2+}_{8}
