= Methyl radical =

Names
- IUPAC name Methyl

Identifiers
CAS Number	2229-07-4
3D model (JSmol)	Interactive image
Beilstein Reference	1696831
ChEBI	CHEBI:29309
ChemSpider	2299212
Gmelin Reference	57
MeSH	Methyl+radical
PubChem CID	3034819
UNII	S19006ZD7R
CompTox Dashboard (EPA)	DTXSID60176836
- InChI: InChI=1S/CH3/h1H3 Key: WCYWZMWISLQXQU-UHFFFAOYSA-N
- SMILES: [CH3]

Properties
Chemical formula	CH_{3}
Molar mass	15.035 g·mol^{−1}
- Except where otherwise noted, data are given for materials in their standard state (at 25 °C [77 °F], 100 kPa). Infobox references

Methyl radical is an organic compound with the chemical formula CH_{3} (also written as [CH_{3}]^{•}). Although extremely rare, it is a colourless gas. Indicative of its high reactivity, its half-life is a few minutes in methanol solution at -196 °C.

== Properties ==
Its first ionization potential (yielding the methenium ion, CH^{+}_{3}) is 9.837±0.005 eV.

=== Structure ===
The molecular geometry of the methyl radical is trigonal planar (bond angles are 120°), although the energy cost of distortion to a pyramidal geometry is small. All other electron-neutral, non-conjugated alkyl radicals are pyramidalized to some extent, though with very small inversion barriers. For instance, the t-butyl radical has a bond angle of 118° with a 0.7 kcal/mol (2.9 kJ/mol) barrier to pyramidal inversion. On the other hand, substitution of hydrogen atoms by more electronegative substituents leads to radicals with a strongly pyramidal geometry (112°), such as the trifluoromethyl radical, CF^{•}_{3}, with a much more substantial inversion barrier of around 25 kcal/mol (100 kJ/mol).

=== Chemical reactions ===
Methyl undergoes the typical chemical reactions of an organic radical. At temperatures above -196 °C, it dimerises to form ethane. Upon treatment with an alcohol, it converts to methane and either an alkoxy or hydroxyalkyl.

== Production ==
=== Biosynthesis ===
Radical SAM enzymes have been proposed to generate methyl radicals by reduction of S-adenosylmethionine.

=== Acetone photolysis ===
It can be produced by the ultraviolet photodissociation of acetone vapour at 193 nm:

(CH_{3})_{2}CO → CO + 2 CH_{3}·

=== Halomethane photolysis ===
It is also produced by the ultraviolet dissociation of iodomethane:

CH_{3}I → I· + CH_{3}·

These studies allowed the recording of the electron spin resonance spectrum of methyl, revealing strong coupling to three equivalent H atoms.

=== Methane oxidation ===
It can also be produced by the reaction of methane with the hydroxyl radical:

OH^{•} + CH_{4} → CH^{•}_{3} + H_{2}O

This process is a step in the major pathway for removal of methane from the atmosphere. The reaction occurs in the troposphere or stratosphere. In addition to being the largest known sink for atmospheric methane, this reaction is one of the most important sources of water vapor in the upper atmosphere. This reaction in the troposphere gives a methane lifetime of 9.6 years. Two more minor sinks are soil sinks (160 year lifetime) and stratospheric loss by reaction with ^{•}OH, ^{•}Cl and ^{•}O^{1}D in the stratosphere (120 year lifetime), giving a net lifetime of 8.4 years.

=== Azomethane pyrolysis ===
Methyl radicals can also be obtained by pyrolysis of azomethane, CH_{3}N=NCH_{3}, in a low-pressure system.

== In the interstellar medium ==
Methyl was discovered in interstellar medium in 2000 by a team led by Helmut Feuchtgruber who detected it using the Infrared Space Observatory. It was first detected in molecular clouds toward the centre of the Milky Way.
