= Pivaloyl chloride =

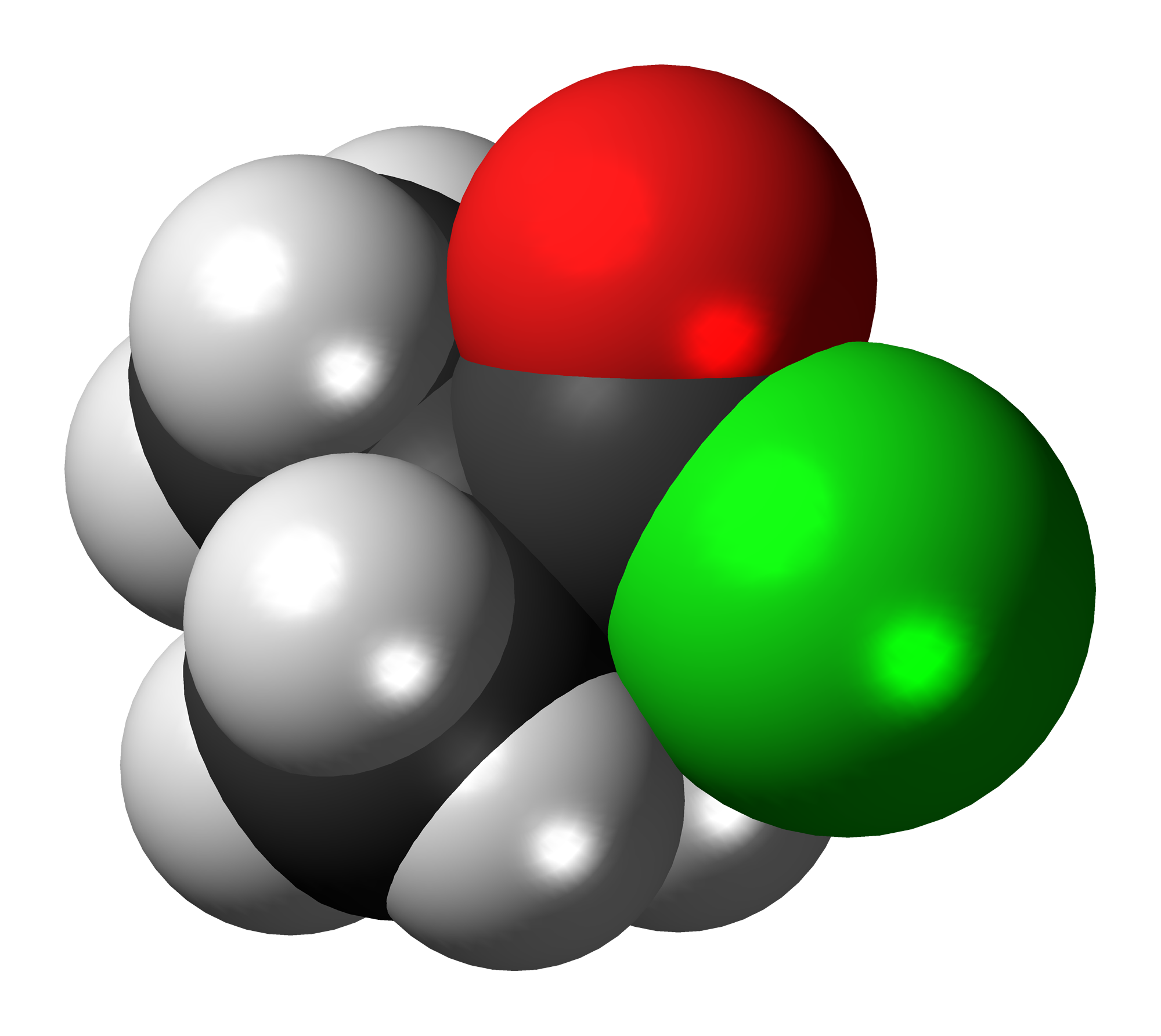

Names
- Preferred IUPAC name 2,2-Dimethylpropanoyl chloride
- Other names Trimethylacetyl chloride; Pivaloyl chloride; Pivalyl chloride; neopentanoylchloride

Identifiers
CAS Number	3282-30-2
3D model (JSmol)	Interactive image
Beilstein Reference	102382
ChEMBL	ChEMBL3183814
ChemSpider	56272
ECHA InfoCard	100.019.929
EC Number	221-921-6
PubChem CID	62493
UNII	JQ82J0O21T
UN number	2438
CompTox Dashboard (EPA)	DTXSID4027529
- InChI: InChI=1S/C5H9ClO/c1-5(2,3)4(6)7/h1-3H3 Key: JVSFQJZRHXAUGT-UHFFFAOYSA-N
- SMILES: CC(C)(C)C(=O)Cl

Properties
Chemical formula	C_{5}H_{9}ClO
Molar mass	120.58 g·mol^{−1}
Density	0.985
Melting point	−57 °C (−71 °F; 216 K)
Boiling point	105.5 °C (221.9 °F; 378.6 K)
Refractive index (n_{D})	1.412

Hazards
- GHS labelling
Pictograms	(GHS02: Flammable) (GHS05: Corrosive) (GHS06: Toxic) (GHS07: Exclamation mark)
Signal word	Danger
Hazard statements	H225, H290, H302, H314, H330
Precautionary statements	P210, P233, P234, P240, P241, P242, P243, P260, P264, P270, P271, P280, P284, P301+P312, P301+P330+P331, P303+P361+P353, P304+P340, P305+P351+P338, P310, P320, P321, P330, P363, P370+P378, P390, P403+P233, P403+P235, P404, P405, P501
Flash point	8 °C (46 °F; 281 K)
- Except where otherwise noted, data are given for materials in their standard state (at 25 °C [77 °F], 100 kPa). Infobox references

2,2-Dimethylpropanoyl chloride is a branched-chain acyl chloride. It was first made by Aleksandr Butlerov in 1874 by reacting pivalic acid with phosphorus pentachloride.

Pivaloyl chloride is used as an input in the manufacture of some drugs, insecticides and herbicides.
