= Arenium ion =

Forms during electrophilic substitution on benzene ring

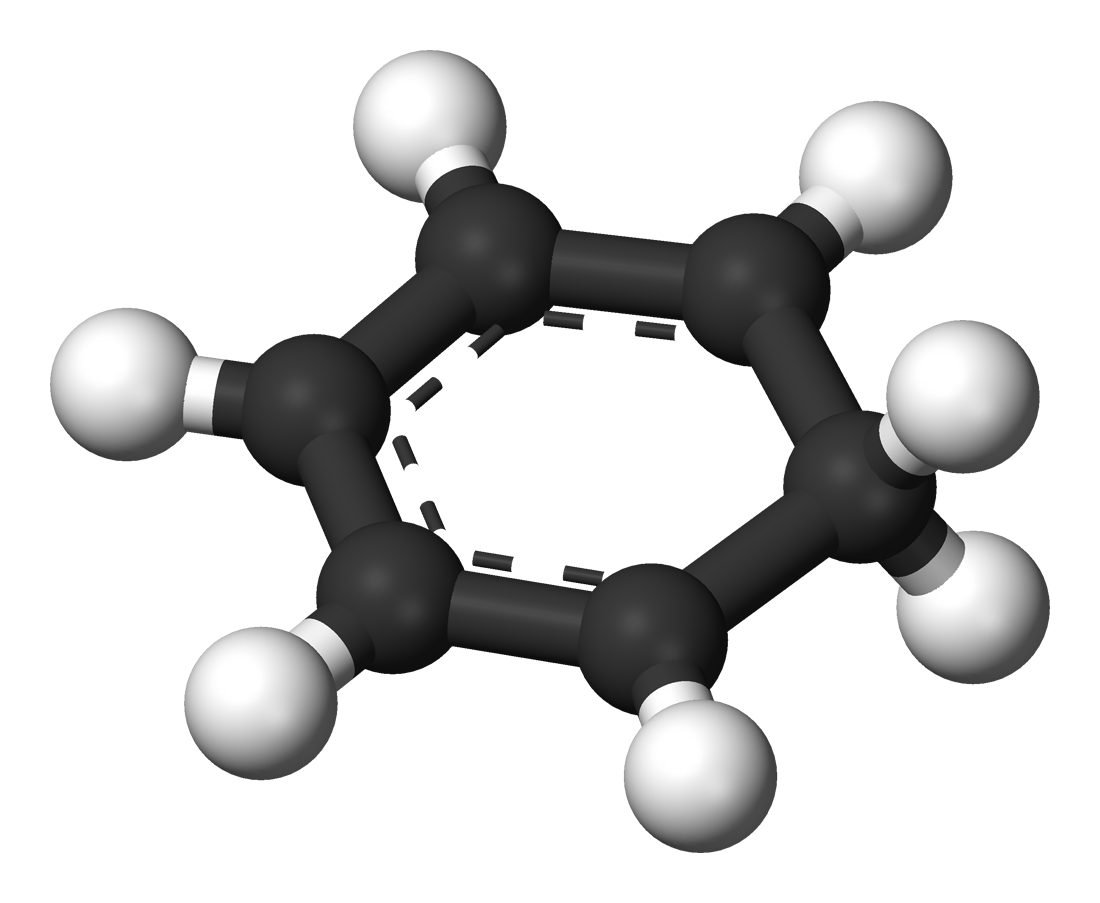
Ball-and-stick model of the benzenium ion

An arenium ion in organic chemistry is a cyclohexadienyl cation that appears as a reactive intermediate in electrophilic aromatic substitution. For historic reasons this complex is also called a Wheland intermediate, after American chemist George Willard Wheland (1907–1976). They are also called sigma complexes. The simplest arenium ion is the benzenium ion (C_{6}H^{+}_{7}), which is protonated benzene.

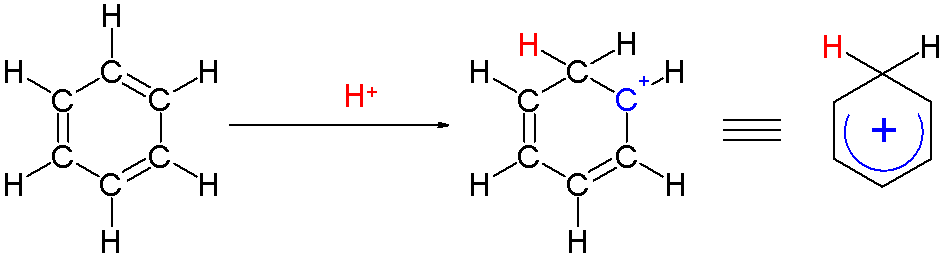

Two hydrogen atoms bonded to one carbon lie in a plane perpendicular to the benzene ring. The arenium ion is no longer an aromatic species; however it is relatively stable due to delocalization: the positive charge is delocalized over 3 carbon atoms by the pi system, as depicted on the following resonance structures:

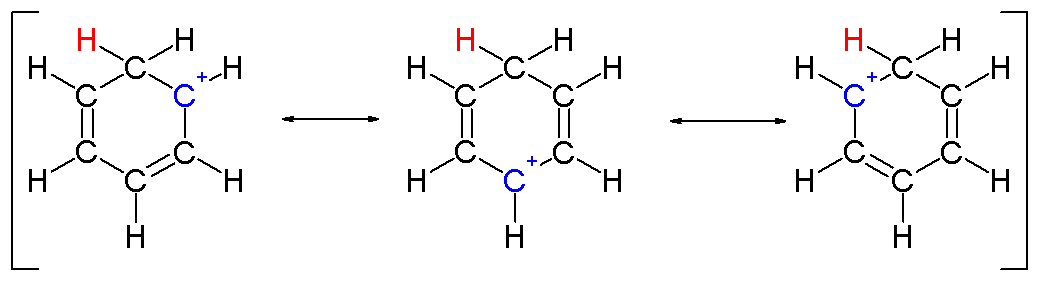

A complexed electrophile can contribute to the stability of arenium ions.

Salts of benzenium ion can be isolated when benzene is protonated by the carborane superacid H(CB_{11}H(CH_{3})_{5}Br_{6}). The benzenium salt is crystalline with thermal stability up to 150 °C. Bond lengths deduced from X-ray crystallography are consistent with a cyclohexadienyl cation structure.

In one study a methylene arenium ion is stabilized by metal complexation:

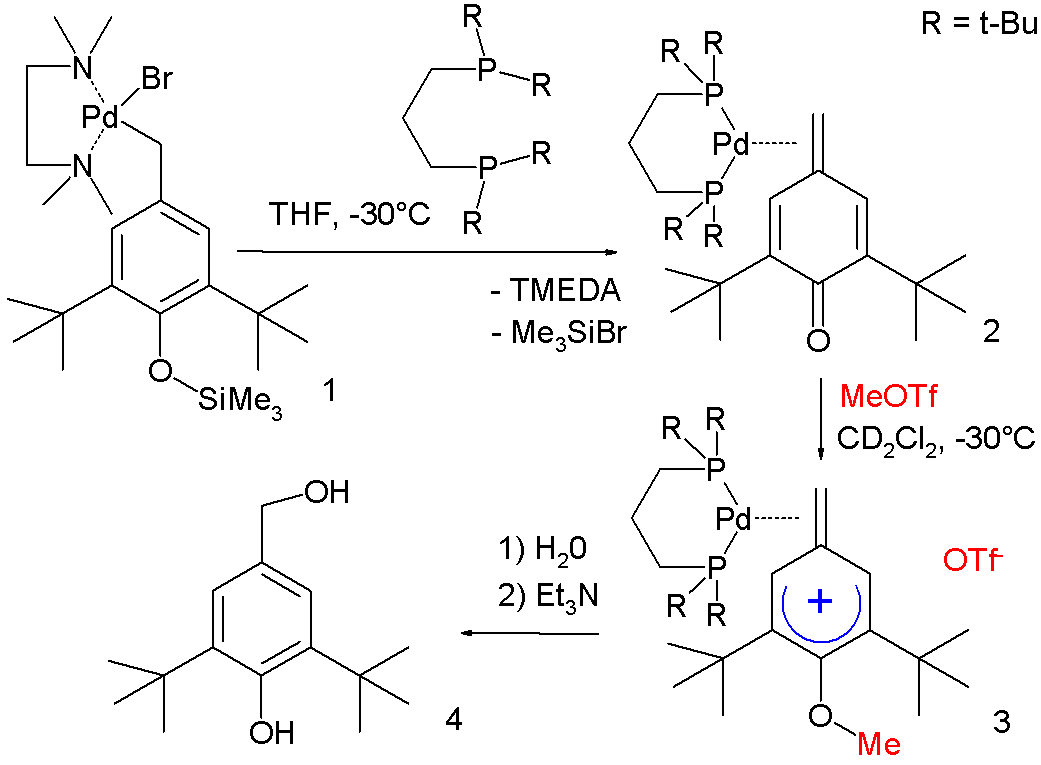

In this reaction sequence the R–Pd(II)–Br starting complex 1 stabilized by TMEDA is converted through dppe to metal complex 2. Electrophilic attack of methyl triflate forms methylene arenium ion 3 with (based on X-ray crystallography) positive charge located in aromatic para position and with the methylene group 6° out of the plane of the ring. Reaction first with water and then with triethylamine hydrolyzes the ether group.

== See also ==
- Aryl radical
- Cyclopentadienyl anion
- Meisenheimer complex, the analogous intermediate in nucleophilic aromatic substitution
- Tropylium cation

== Some historic references ==
- Olah, G. A. (1972). "Stable carbocations. CXVIII. General concept and structure of carbocations based on differentiation of trivalent (classical) carbenium ions from three-center bound penta- or tetracoordinated (nonclassical) carbonium ions. Role of carbocations in electrophilic reactions". J. Am. Chem. Soc. 94 (3): 808–820. doi:10.1021/ja00758a020.
- Wheland, G. W. (1942). "A Quantum Mechanical Investigation of the Orientation of Substituents in Aromatic Molecules". J. Am. Chem. Soc. 64 (4): 900–908. doi:10.1021/ja01256a047.
