= Diazo =

Chemical group (>C=N=N)

Diazo compounds have two main Lewis structures in resonance: R_{2}>C^{−}–N^{+}≡N and R_{2}>CH=N^{+}=N^{−}

In organic chemistry, the diazo group is an organic moiety consisting of two linked nitrogen atoms at the terminal position. Overall charge-neutral organic compounds containing the diazo group bound to a carbon atom are called diazo compounds or diazoalkanes (Note: The term diazoalkane is used by some authors to refer to any substituted diazomethane (i.e., all diazo compounds). However, other authors use the term to refer exclusively to diazo compounds with alkyl substituents that do not contain other functional groups (which would exclude compounds like diazo(diphenyl)methane or ethyl diazoacetate).) and are described by the general structural formula R_{2}C=N^{+}=N^{−}. The simplest example of a diazo compound is diazomethane, CH_{2}N_{2}. Diazo compounds (R_{2}C=N_{2}) should not be confused with azo compounds (R−N=N−R) or with diazonium compounds (R−N^{+}_{2}).

== Structure ==
The electronic structure of diazo compounds is characterized by π electron density delocalized over the α-carbon and two nitrogen atoms, along with an orthogonal π system with electron density delocalized over only the terminal nitrogen atoms. Because all octet rule-satisfying resonance forms of diazo compounds have formal charges, they are members of a class of compounds known as 1,3-dipoles. Some of the most stable diazo compounds are α-diazo-β-diketones and α-diazo-β-diesters, in which the electron density is further delocalized into an electron-withdrawing carbonyl group. In contrast, most diazoalkanes without electron-withdrawing substituents, including diazomethane itself, are explosive. A commercially relevant diazo compound is ethyl diazoacetate (N_{2}CHCOOEt). A group of isomeric compounds with only few similar properties are the diazirines, where the carbon and two nitrogens are linked as a ring.

Four resonance structures can be drawn:

Compounds with the diazo moiety should be distinguished from diazonium compounds, which have the same terminal azo group but bear an overall positive charge, and azo compounds in which the azo group bridges two organic substituents.

== History ==
Diazo compounds were first produced by Peter Griess who had discovered a versatile new chemical reaction, as detailed in his 1858 paper "Preliminary notice on the influence of nitrous acid on aminonitro- and aminodinitrophenol."

== Synthesis ==
Several methods exist for the preparation of diazo compounds. Classically, diazos were prepared via diazo coupling, but the reaction only produces diaryl diazo compounds.

=== From amines or nitrosamines ===
Alkyl-acyl nitrosamines in base dehydrate to diazo compounds:

The mechanism shown here is one possibility; see diazald for an alternative.

Examples are the laboratory synthesis of diazomethane from diazald or MNNG.

In some cases, the nitrosamine can be produced in situ without base. Primary aliphatic amines R-CH_{2}-NH_{2} with an α acceptor (R = COOR, CN, CHO, COR) directly generate a diazo compound in nitrous acid.

=== From hydrazones ===
Hydrazones are oxidized (dehydrogenation) for example with silver oxide or mercury oxide; for example, the synthesis of 2-diazopropane from acetone hydrazone. Other oxidizing reagents are lead tetraacetate, manganese dioxide and the Swern reagent. Tosyl hydrazones RRC=N-NHTs are reacted with base for example triethylamine in the synthesis of crotyl diazoacetate and in the synthesis of phenyldiazomethane from PhCHNHTs and sodium methoxide. More recently, N-triftosylhydrazones have been introduced as highly efficient, easily decomposable diazo surrogates capable of generating diazo intermediates in situ at temperatures as low as −40 °C.

Reaction of a carbonyl group with the hydrazine 1,2-bis(tert-butyldimethylsilyl)hydrazine to form the hydrazone is followed by reaction with the iodane difluoroiodobenzene yields the diazo compound:

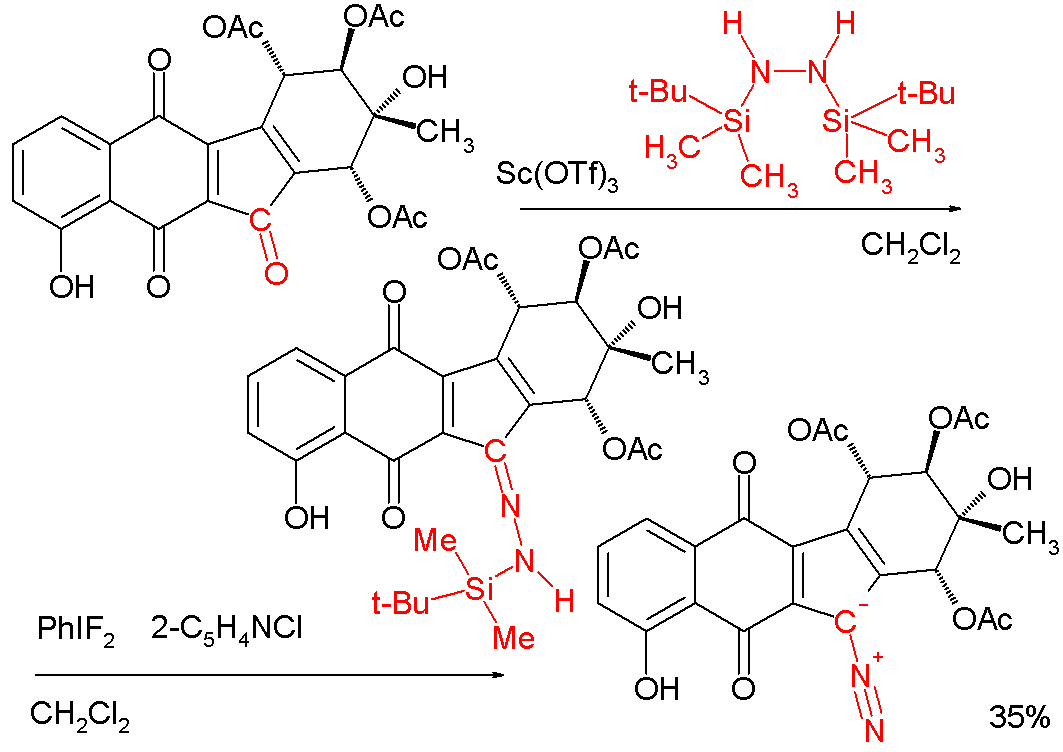

=== From diazomethyl compounds ===
The carbon center of diazomethane is somewhat nucleophilic, more so in trimethylsilyldiazomethane. Thus a (usually carbonyl-based) electrophile can substitute for one of the hydrogens in these compounds to make a more complicated diazo compound.

=== By diazo transfer ===
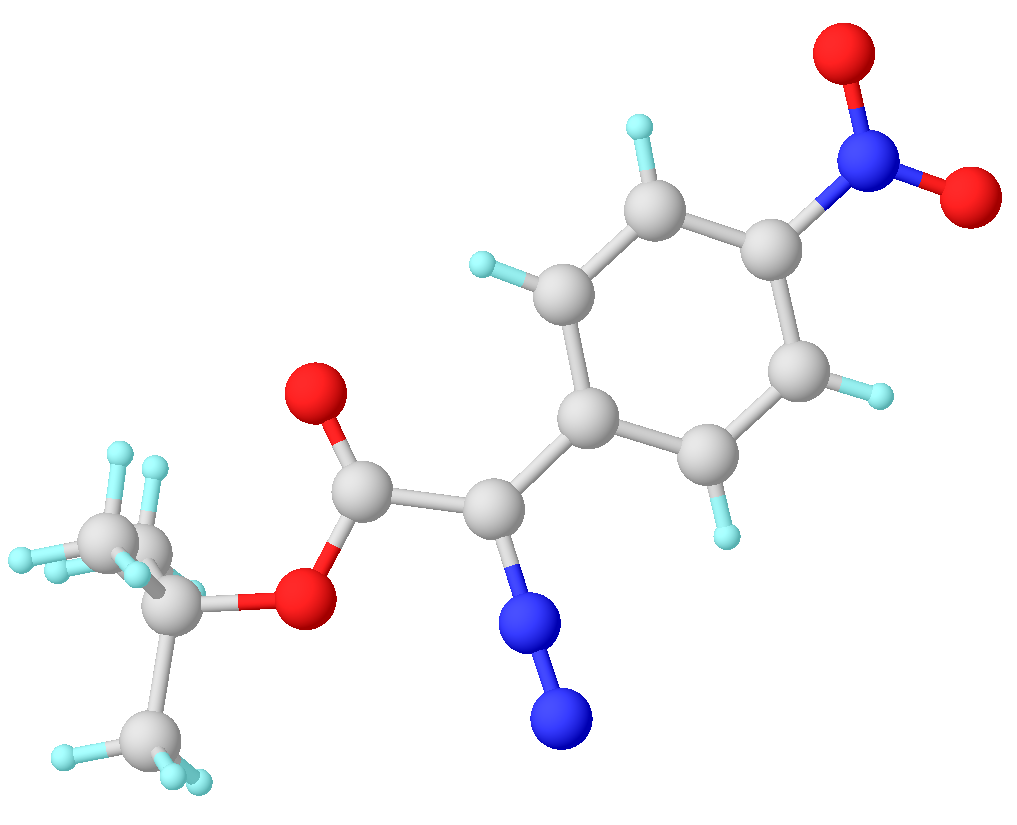
Solid state structure of the diazo compound t-BuO_{2}CC(N_{2})C_{6}H_{4}NO_{2}. Key distances: C-N = 1.329 Å, N-N = 1.121 Å.

In diazo transfer, sometimes called Regitz diazo transfer, certain carbon acids react with sulfonyl azides and a weak base like triethylamine or DBU, with corresponding sulfonamide byproduct. The mechanism involves enolate attack at the terminal nitrogen, proton transfer, and sulfonamide anion expulsion.

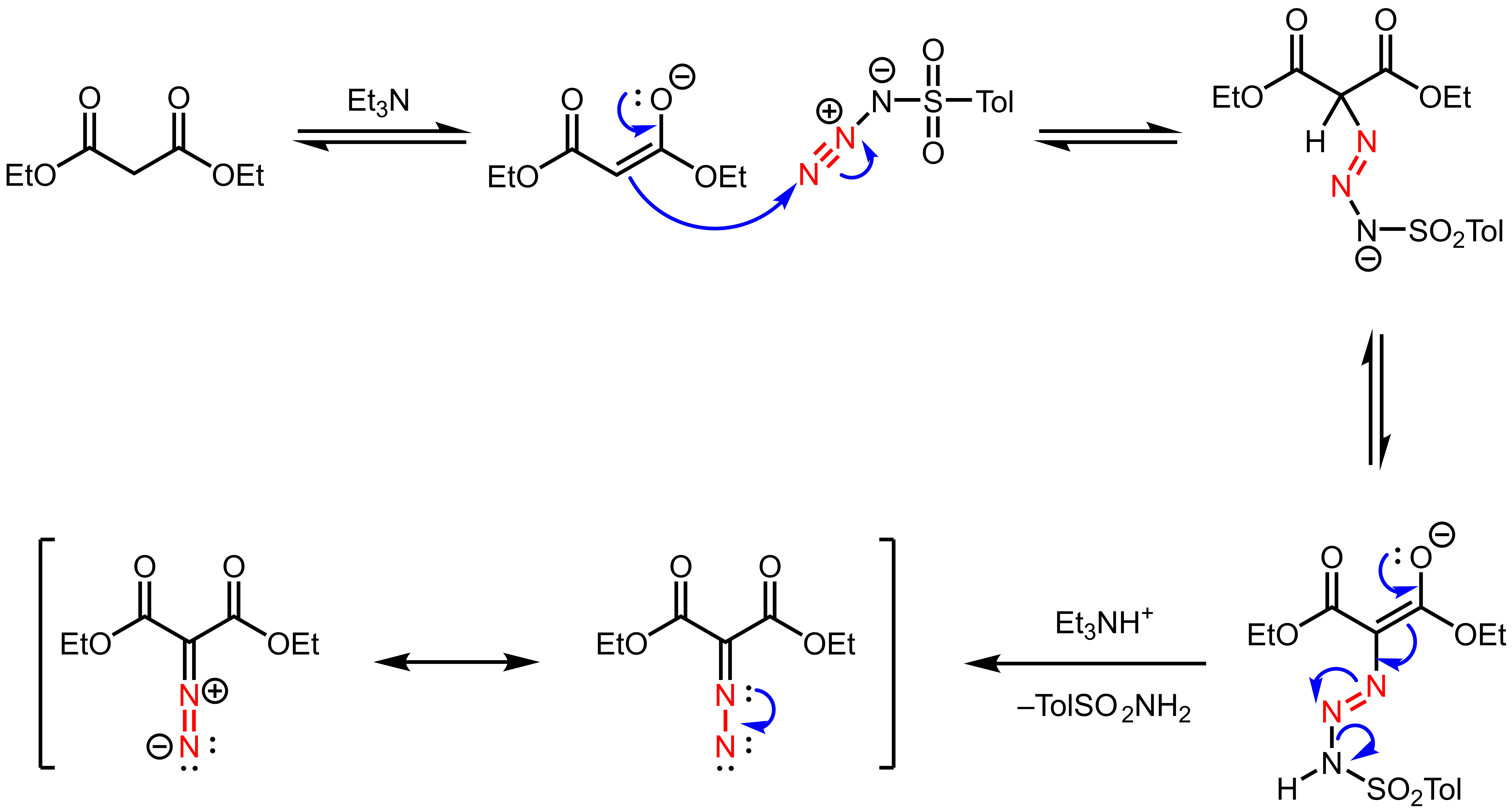

Historically, Regitz transferred from tosyl azide, but modern transfer uses reagents that are less explosive or more easily separated from the reaction products. These include imidazole-1-sulfonyl azide, p‑acetanilidesulfonyl azide, and methanesulfonyl azide. β-Carbonyl aldehydes undergo a deformylative variant to give primary diazo compounds stabilized by only the ketone.

Simple examples synthesize tert-butyl diazoacetate, diazomalonate, or methyl phenyldiazoacetate (from methyl phenylacetate).

In a more complicated example, phenacyl bromide reacts with trimethylphosphite and then sodium hydride and methanesulfonyl azide to give a diazo product that converts aldehydes into alkynes. This method resembles the Ohira-Bestmann reagent but is significantly more expensive.

=== From azides ===
One method is described for the synthesis of diazo compounds from azides using phosphines:

== Reactions ==
=== In cycloadditions ===
Diazo compounds react as 1,3-dipoles in diazoalkane 1,3-dipolar cycloadditions.

=== As carbene precursors ===
Diazo compounds are used as precursors to carbenes, which are generated by thermolysis or photolysis, for example in the Wolff rearrangement. (In this regard, they resemble diazirenes.) As such they are used in cyclopropanation for example in the reaction of ethyl diazoacetate with styrene. Certain diazo compounds can couple to form alkenes in a formal carbene dimerization reaction.

Diazo compounds are intermediates in the Bamford–Stevens reaction of tosylhydrazones to alkenes, again with a carbene intermediate:

In the Doyle–Kirmse reaction, certain diazo compounds react with allyl sulfides to the homoallyl sulfide. Intramolecular reactions of diazocarbonyl compounds provide access to cyclopropanes. In the Buchner ring expansion, diazo compounds react with aromatic rings with ring-expansion.

=== As nucleophile ===
The Nierenstein reaction begins when diazomethane displaces an acyl halide. The same reaction is the first step in the Arndt-Eistert synthesis.

The Buchner-Curtius-Schlotterbeck reaction yields ketones from aldehydes and aliphatic diazo compounds:

The reaction type is nucleophilic addition.

== Occurrence in nature ==
Several families of naturally occurring products feature the diazo group. The kinamycins and lomaiviticin are DNA intercalating molecules, with the diazo functionality as their "warheads". In the presence of a reducing agent, loss of N_{2} occurs to generate a DNA-cleaving fluorenyl radical.

One biochemical process for diazo formation is the L-aspartate-nitro-succinate (ANS) pathway. It involves a sequence of enzyme-mediated redox reactions to generate nitrite by way of a nitrosuccinic acid intermediate. This pathway appears to be active in several different Streptomyces species, and homologous genes appear widespread in actinobacteria.

== See also ==
- Fluorosulfonyl azide
- Isodiazene
- Reprography
- Whiteprint
