= Cyclopropanation =

Chemical process which generates cyclopropane rings

In organic chemistry, cyclopropanation refers to any chemical process which generates cyclopropane ((CH_{2})_{3}) rings. It is an important process in modern chemistry as many useful compounds bear this motif; for example pyrethroid insecticides and a number of quinolone antibiotics (ciprofloxacin, sparfloxacin, etc.). However, the high ring strain present in cyclopropanes makes them challenging to produce and generally requires the use of highly reactive species, such as carbenes, ylids and carbanions. Many of the reactions proceed in a cheletropic manner.

The structures of the natural insecticides pyrethrin I, R = CH_{3} and pyrethrin II, R = CO_{2}CH_{3}.

== Approaches ==
=== From alkenes using carbenoid reagents ===
Several methods exist for converting alkenes to cyclopropane rings using carbene type reagents. As carbenes themselves are highly reactive it is common for them to be used in a stabilised form, referred to as a carbenoid.

==== Simmons–Smith reaction ====
In the Simmons–Smith reaction the reactive carbenoid is iodomethylzinc iodide, which is typically formed by a reaction between diiodomethane and a zinc-copper couple. Modifications involving cheaper alternatives have been developed, such as dibromomethane or diazomethane and zinc iodide. The reactivity of the system can also be increased by exchanging the zinc‑copper couple for diethylzinc. Asymmetric versions are known.

==== Using diazo compounds ====
Certain diazo compounds, such as diazomethane, can react with olefins to produce cyclopropanes in a 2 step manner. The first step involves a 1,3-dipolar cycloaddition to form a pyrazoline which then undergoes denitrogenation, either photochemically or by thermal decomposition, to give cyclopropane. The thermal route, which often uses KOH and platinum as catalysts, is also known as the Kishner cyclopropane synthesis after the Russian chemist Nikolai Kischner and can also be performed using hydrazine and α,β-unsaturated carbonyl compounds. The mechanism of decomposition has been the subject of several studies and remains somewhat controversial, although it is broadly thought to proceed via a diradical species. In terms of green chemistry this method is superior to other carbene based cyclopropanations; as it does not involve metals or halogenated reagents, and produces only N_{2} as a by-product. However the reaction can be dangerous as trace amounts of unreacted diazo compounds may explode during the thermal rearrangement of the pyrazoline.

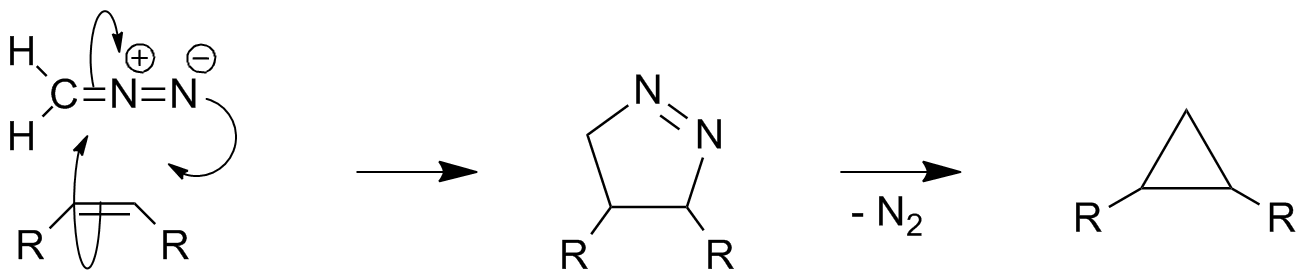

==== Using diazo compounds with metal catalysis ====
Methyl phenyldiazoacetate and many related diazo derivatives are precursors to donor-acceptor carbenes, which can be used for cyclopropanation or to insert into C-H bonds of organic substrates. These reactions are catalyzed by rhodium(II) trifluoroacetate and related chiral derivatives.

==== Using free carbenes ====
Free carbenes can be employed for cyclopropanation reactions, however there is limited scope for this as few can be produced conveniently and nearly all are unstable (see: carbene dimerization). An exception are dihalocarbenes such as dichlorocarbene or difluorocarbene, which are reasonably stable and will react to form geminal dihalo-cyclopropanes. These compounds can then be used to form allenes via the Skattebøl rearrangement.

The Buchner ring expansion reaction also involves the formation of a stabilised carbene. Cyclopropanation is also stereospecific as the addition of carbene and carbenoids to alkenes is a form of a cheletropic reaction, with the addition taking place in a syn manner. For example, dibromocarbene and cis-2-butene yield cis-2,3-dimethyl-1,1-dibromocyclopropane, whereas the trans isomer exclusively yields the trans cyclopropane.

=== From alkenes using ylides ===
Cyclopropanes can be generated using a sulphur ylide in the Johnson–Corey–Chaykovsky reaction, however this process is largely limited to use on electron-poor olefines, particularly α,β-unsaturated carbonyl compounds.

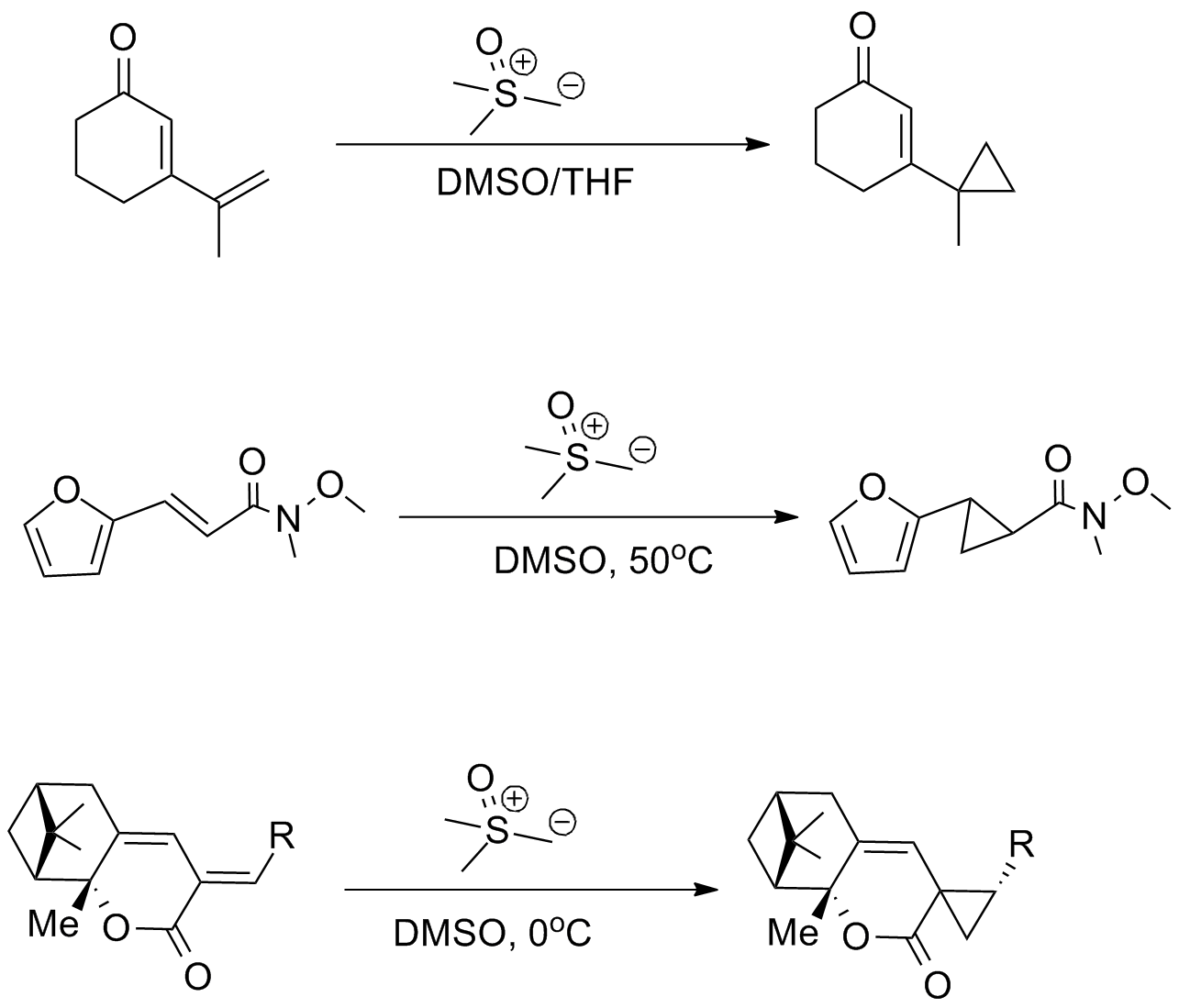

=== Intramolecular cyclisation ===
Cyclopropanes can be obtained by a variety of intramolecular cyclisation reactions. A simple method is to use primary haloalkanes bearing appropriately placed electron withdrawing groups. Treatment with a strong base will generate a carbanion which will cyclise in a 3-exo-trig manner, with displacement of the halide. Examples include the formation of cyclopropyl cyanide and cyclopropylacetylene This mechanism also forms the basis of the Favorskii rearrangement.

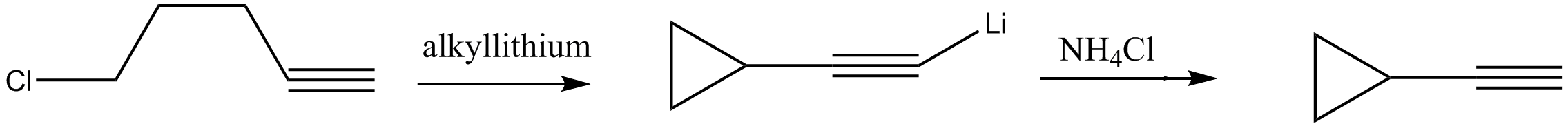

A related process is the cyclisation of 1,3-dibromopropane via a Wurtz coupling. This was used for the first synthesis of cyclopropane by August Freund in 1881. Originally this reaction was performed using sodium, however the yield can be improved by exchanging this for zinc.

BrCH_{2}CH_{2}CH_{2}Br + 2 Na → (CH_{2})_{3} + 2 NaBr

With a sufficiently active carbon acid, the difunctional haloalkane can be formed in situ. Thus, for example, ethylene dichloride cyclopropanates allyl and benzyl cyanides in base.

=== Other approaches ===
- The Kulinkovich reaction form cyclopropanols via a reaction between esters and Grignard reagents in presence of a titanium alkoxide.
- The Bingel reaction is a specialised cyclopropanation reaction used to functionalise a fullerene.
- In the di-π-methane rearrangement, photochemical stimulation causes 1,4-dienes to rearrange to form vinylcyclopropanes. These can then undergo vinylcyclopropane rearrangements
- Cyclopropane-fatty-acyl-phospholipid synthase performs cyclopropanation in biological systems
- Using Cobalt(II)–porphyrin catalysis, using diazo compounds and olefins.

== Biosynthesis ==
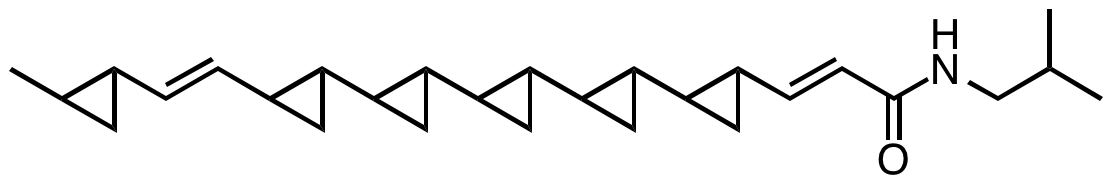
Structure of U-106305, a derivative of a cyclopropane fatty acid with six cyclopropane rings, isolated from Streptomyces sp

Although cyclopropanes are relatively rare in biochemistry, many cyclopropanation pathways have been identified in nature. The most common pathways involve ring closure reactions of carbocations in terpenoids. Cyclopropane fatty acids are derived from the attack of S-adenosylmethionine (SAM) on unsaturated fatty acids. The precursor to the hormone ethylene, 1-aminocyclopropane-1-carboxylic acid, is derived directly from SMM via intramolecular nucleophilic displacement of the SMe_{2} group subsequent to condensation with pyridoxal phosphate. Direct carbene transfer from diazoesters to olefins has also been achieved through in vitro biocatalysis using engineered variants of the cytochrome P450 enzyme from Bacillus megaterium that were optimized by directed evolution.
