= CH2N2 =

|

CH_{2}N_{2} may refer to:

- Cyanamide, an organic compound
- Diazirine, class of organic molecules with a cyclopropene-like ring, 3H-diazirene
- Diazomethane, chemical compound discovered in 1894
- Isodiazomethane, parent compound of a class of derivatives of general formula R2N–NC
- Nitrilimine, class of organic compounds sharing a common functional group with the general structure R-CN-NR
