= Methyldiazonium =

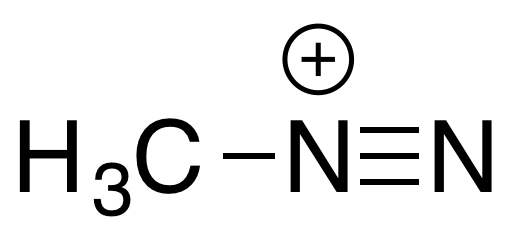

Names
- IUPAC name Methanediazonium

Identifiers
| CAS Number | 20404-06-2 |
| 3D model (JSmol) | Interactive image |
| ChEBI | CHEBI:176914 |
| ChEMBL | ChEMBL2419248 |
| ChemSpider | 103148 |
| KEGG | C20302 |
| PubChem CID | 115287 |
| UNII | 4MD529UV3B |
| CompTox Dashboard (EPA) | DTXSID40174355 |
- InChI: InChI=1S/CH3N2/c1-3-2/h1H3/q+1 Key: RRJZCACJJKZDNV-UHFFFAOYSA-N
- SMILES: C[N+]#N

Properties
| Chemical formula | CH_{3}N_{2}^{+} |
| Molar mass | 43.048 g·mol^{−1} |
| Acidity (pK_{a}) | <10 |
| Conjugate base | Diazomethane |
- Except where otherwise noted, data are given for materials in their standard state (at 25 °C [77 °F], 100 kPa). Infobox references

Methyldiazonium is an organic compound consisting of a methyl group attached to a diazo group. This cation is the conjugate acid of diazomethane, with an estimated pK_{a}<10.

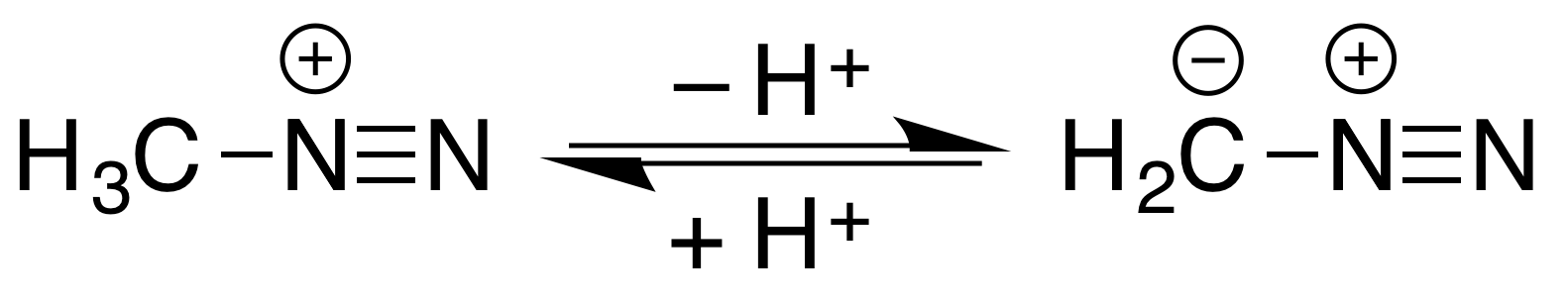

It is an intermediate in methylation reactions of diazomethane with acidic hydroxyl compounds, such as conversion of carboxylic acids to methyl esters and phenols to methyl ethers.

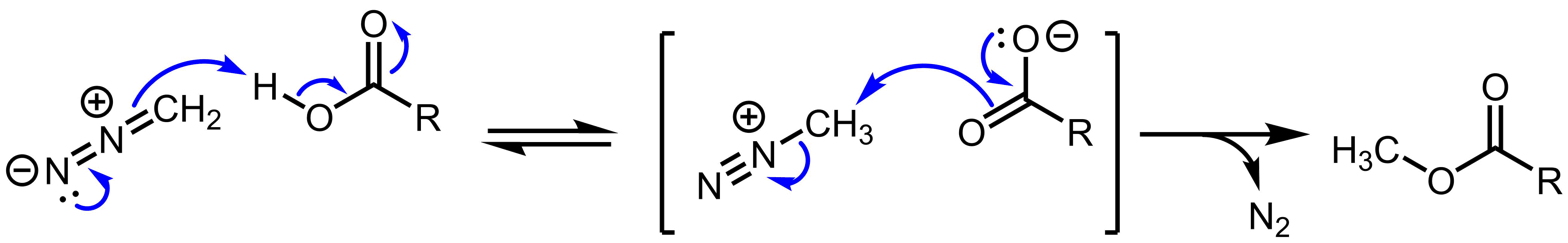

It has been implicated as the metabolite of N-nitrosodimethylamine responsible for the observed carcinogenicity of that compound.
