= Cycloheptatriene =

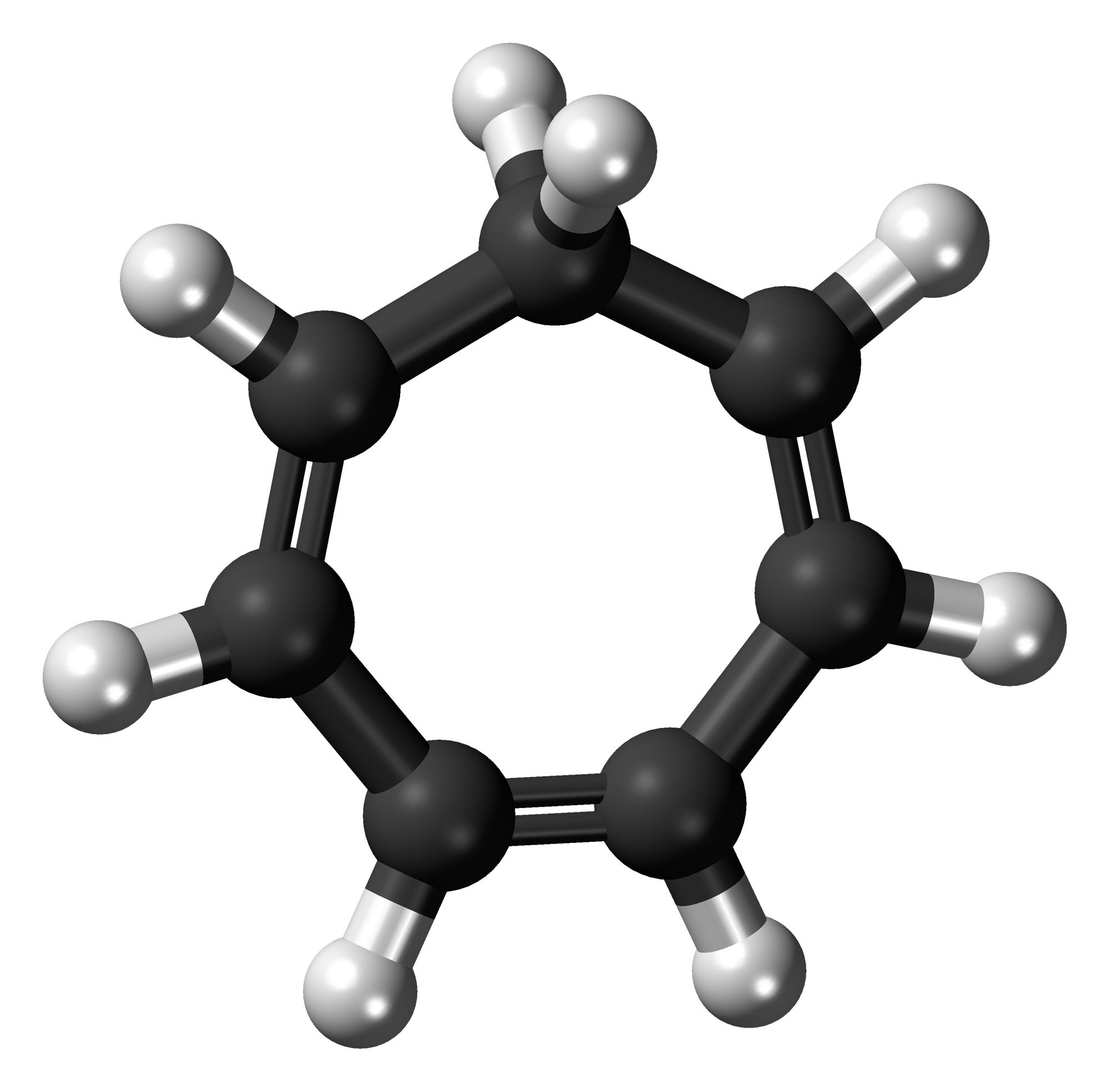

Names
- Preferred IUPAC name Cyclohepta-1,3,5-triene
- Other names 1,3,5-Cycloheptatriene; 1H-[7]Annulene; CHT; Tropilidene

Identifiers
CAS Number	544-25-2
3D model (JSmol)	Interactive image
Beilstein Reference	506066
ChEBI	CHEBI:37519
ChemSpider	10534
ECHA InfoCard	100.008.061
EC Number	208-866-3
Gmelin Reference	1943
PubChem CID	11000
UNII	P58Q106NTF
UN number	2603
CompTox Dashboard (EPA)	DTXSID5073909
- InChI: InChI=1S/C7H8/c1-2-4-6-7-5-3-1/h1-6H,7H2 Key: CHVJITGCYZJHLR-UHFFFAOYSA-N; InChI=1/C7H8/c1-2-4-6-7-5-3-1/h1-6H,7H2 Key: CHVJITGCYZJHLR-UHFFFAOYAI
- SMILES: C1=C\C/C=C\C=C1

Properties
Chemical formula	C_{7}H_{8}
Molar mass	92.141 g·mol^{−1}
Appearance	Colourless liquid
Density	0.888 g/mL at 25 °C
Melting point	−80 °C (−112 °F; 193 K)
Boiling point	116 °C (241 °F; 389 K)
Solubility in water	Insoluble in water
Acidity (pK_{a})	36

Hazards
- GHS labelling
Pictograms	(GHS02: Flammable) (GHS06: Toxic) (GHS07: Exclamation mark) (GHS08: Health hazard)
Signal word	Danger
Hazard statements	H225, H301, H304, H311, H315, H319, H335
Precautionary statements	P210, P233, P240, P241, P242, P243, P261, P264, P270, P271, P280, P301+P310, P302+P352, P303+P361+P353, P304+P340, P305+P351+P338, P312, P321, P322, P330, P331, P332+P313, P337+P313, P361, P362, P363, P370+P378, P403+P233, P403+P235, P405, P501
- Except where otherwise noted, data are given for materials in their standard state (at 25 °C [77 °F], 100 kPa). verify (what is ?) Infobox references

Cycloheptatriene (CHT) is an organic compound with the formula C_{7}H_{8}. It is a closed ring of seven carbon atoms joined by three double bonds (as the name implies) and four single bonds. This colourless liquid has been of recurring theoretical interest in organic chemistry. It is a ligand in organometallic chemistry and a building block in organic synthesis. Cycloheptatriene is not aromatic, as reflected by the nonplanarity of the methylene bridge (−CH_{2}−) with respect to the other atoms; however the related tropylium cation is, rendering the compound relatively suspectible to oxidation.

== Synthesis ==
Albert Ladenburg first generated cycloheptatriene in 1881 by the decomposition of tropine. The structure was finally proven by the synthesis of Richard Willstätter in 1901. This synthesis started from cycloheptanone and established the seven membered ring structure of the compound.

Cycloheptatriene can be obtained in the laboratory by photochemical reaction of benzene with diazomethane or the pyrolysis of the adduct of cyclohexene and dichlorocarbene. A related classic synthesis for cycloheptatriene derivatives, the Buchner ring enlargement, starts with the reaction of benzene with ethyl diazoacetate to give the corresponding norcaradiene ethyl ester, which then undergoes a thermally-allowed electrocyclic ring expansion to give 1,3,5-cycloheptatriene 7-carboxylic acid ethyl ester.

The Buchner ring expansion, a classical synthesis for cycloheptatriene derivatives

Selected cycloheptatriene derivatives

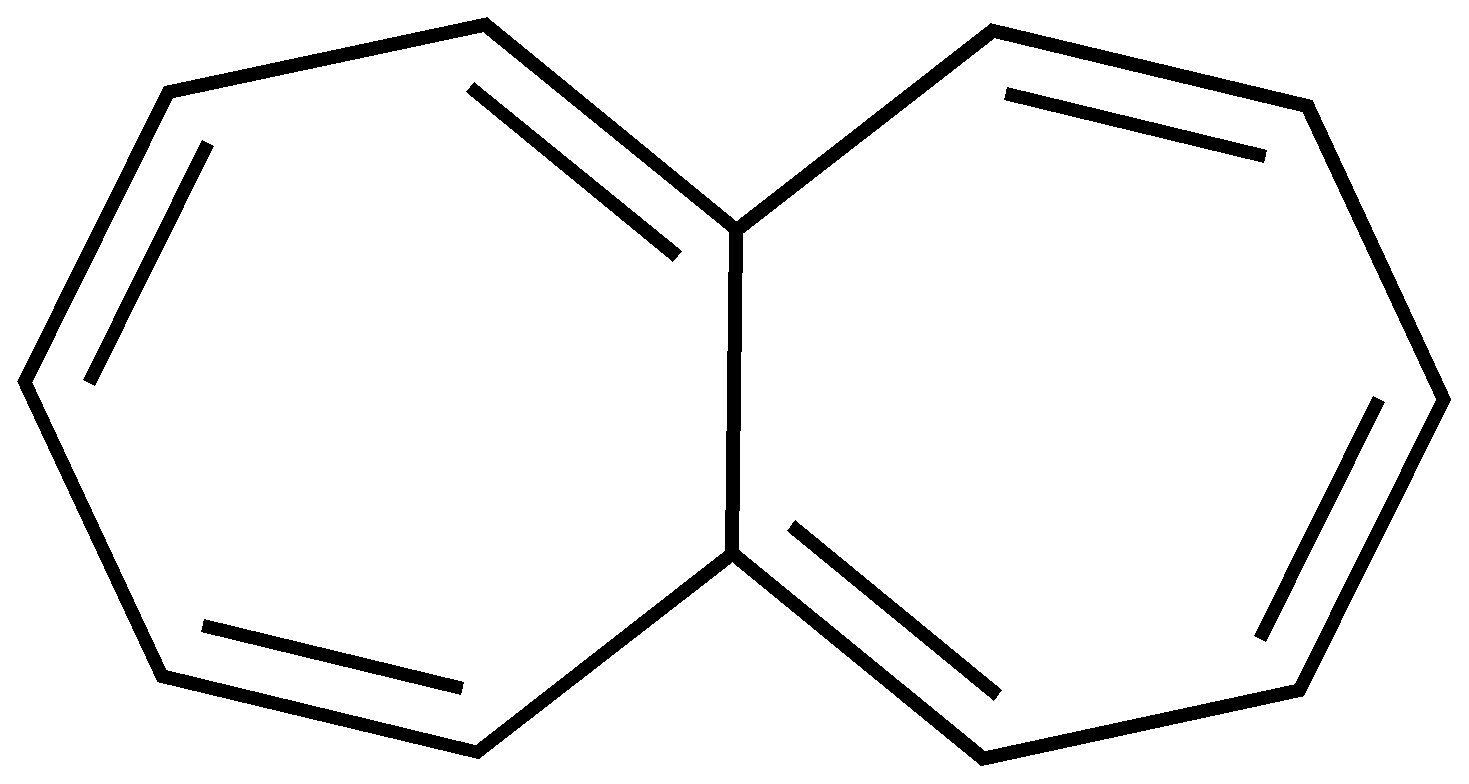
Heptalene – composed of two fused cycloheptatriene rings.

Azulene – composed of fused cyclopentadiene and cycloheptatriene rings.

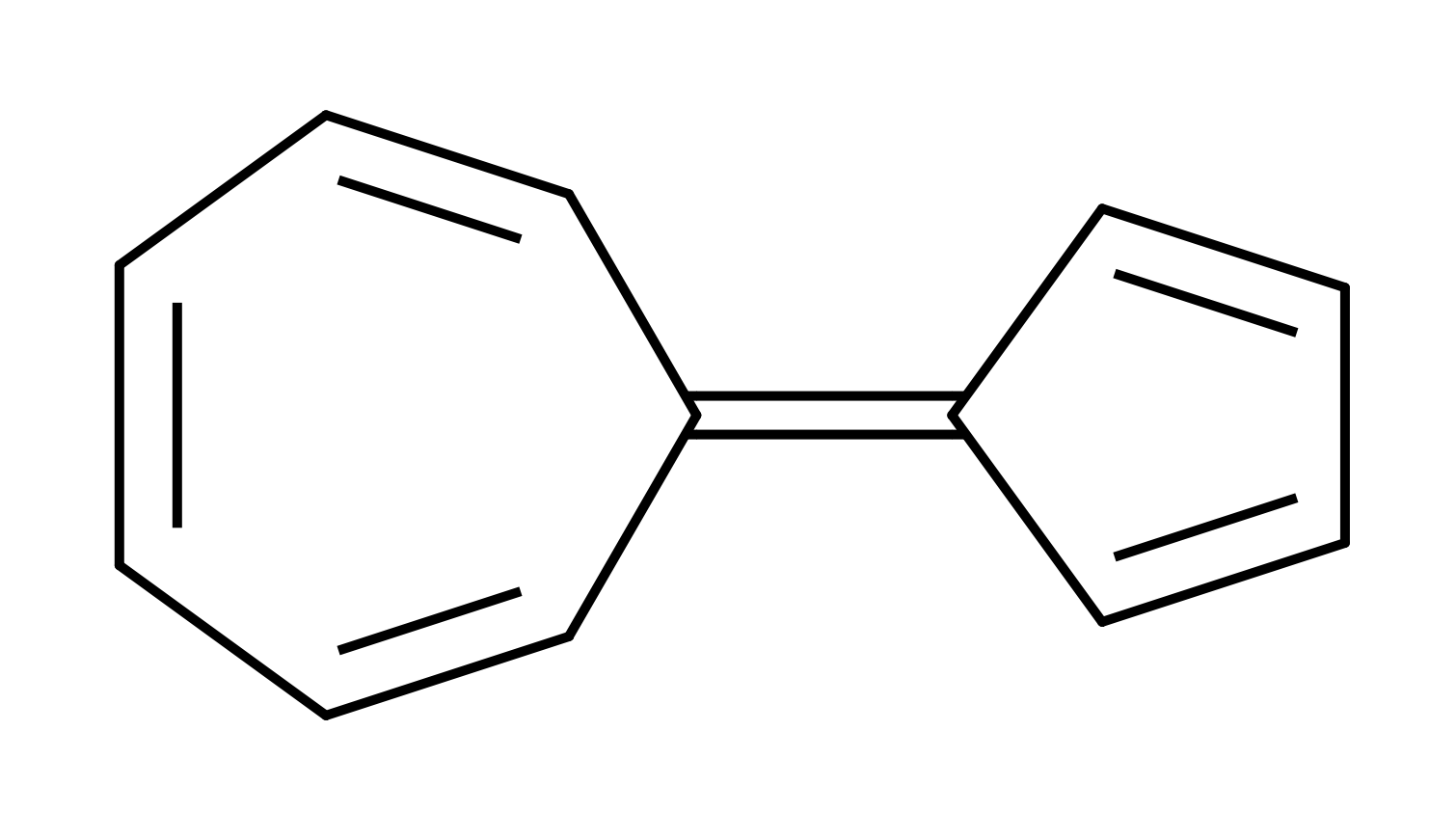
Sesquifulvalene – composed of linked cyclopentadiene and cycloheptatriene rings.

Elassovalene – composed of one cycloheptatriene and two fused cyclopentene rings.

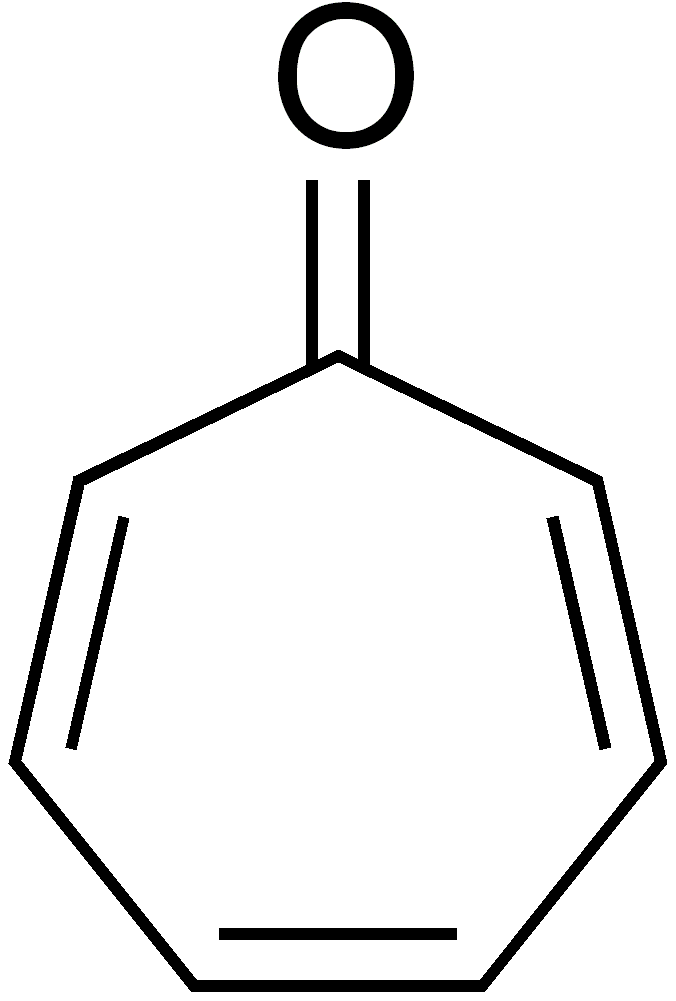
Tropone – composed of cycloheptatriene ring and carbonyl group.

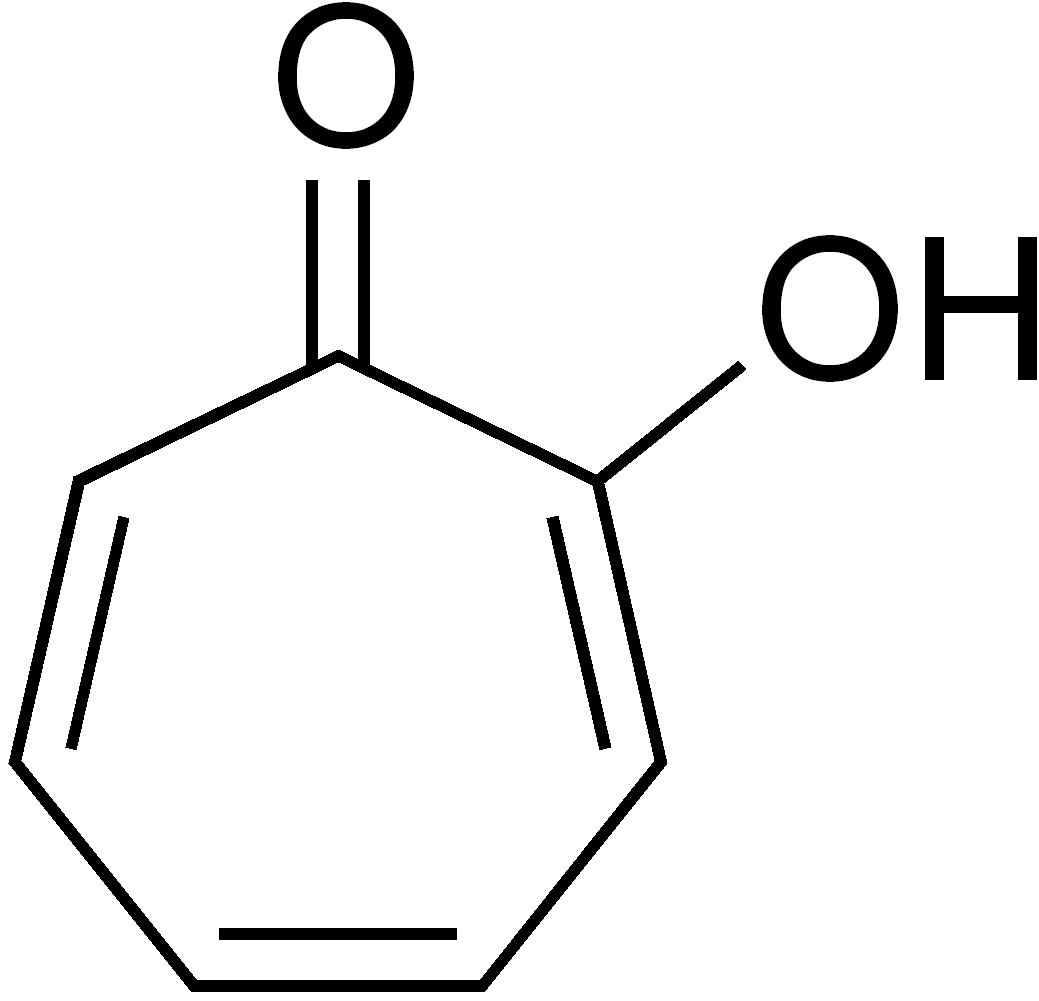
Tropolone – composed of cycloheptatriene ring, carbonyl and hydroxy groups.

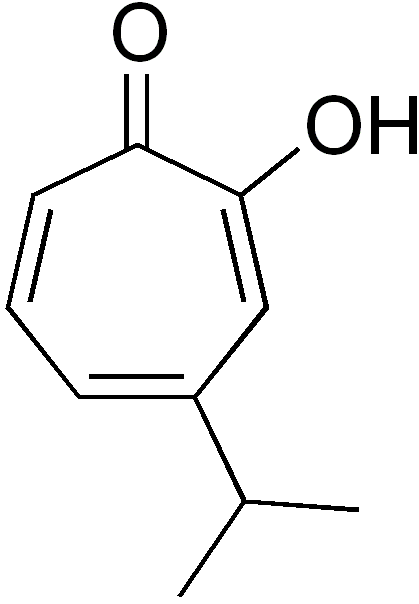
Hinokitiol – composed of cycloheptatriene ring, isopropyl, carbonyl and hydroxy groups (isopropyl cycloheptatrienolone).

== Reactions ==
Removal of a hydride ion from the methylene bridge gives the planar and aromatic cycloheptatriene cation, also called the tropylium ion. A practical route to this cation employs PCl_{5} as the oxidant. CHT behaves as a diene in Diels–Alder reactions, for example with maleic anhydride:

Many metal complexes of cycloheptatriene are known, including Cr(CO)_{3}(C_{7}H_{8}) and cycloheptatrienemolybdenum tricarbonyl.

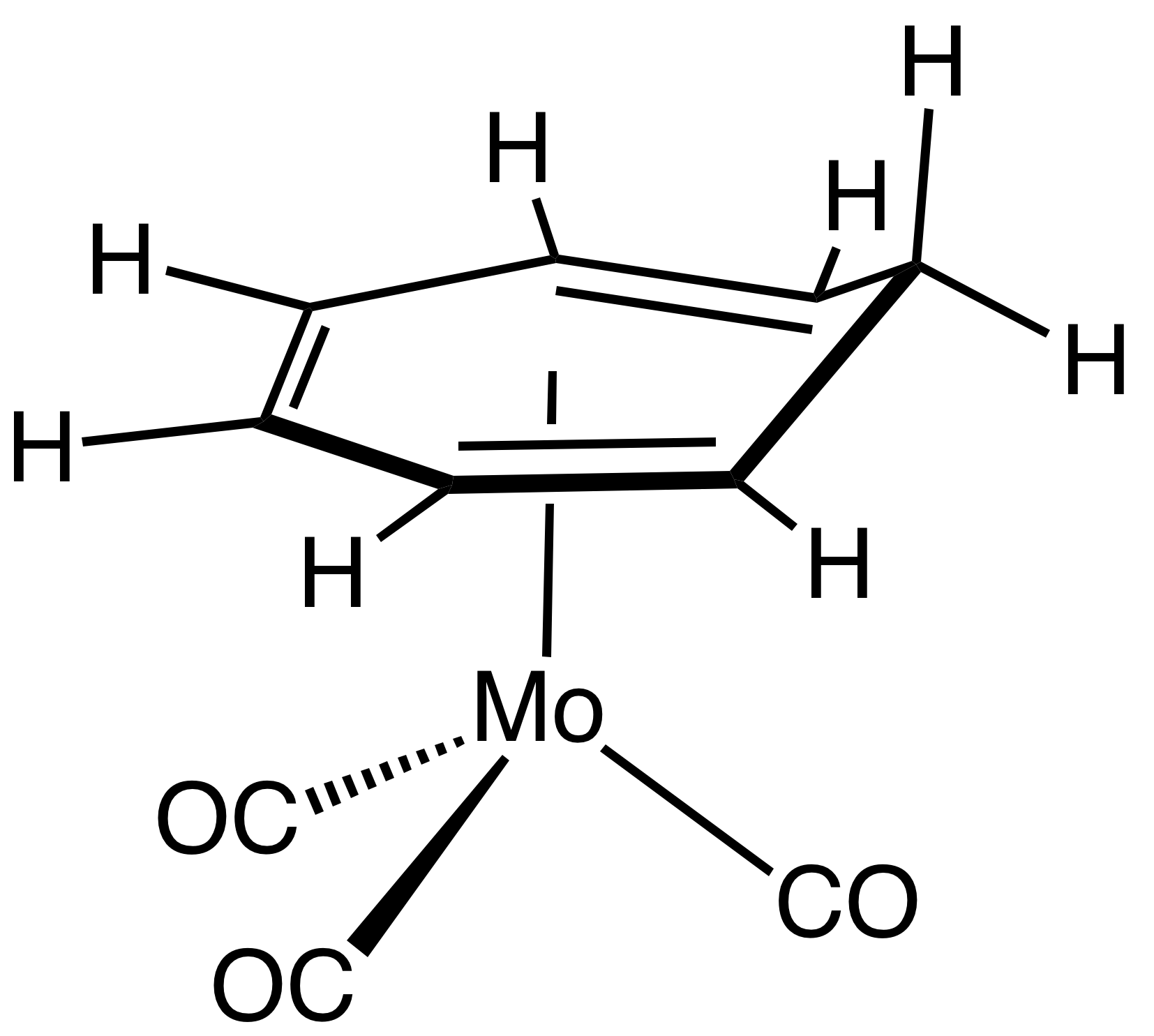
Structure of Mo(C_{7}H_{8})(CO)_{3}.

Cyclooctatetraene and cycloheptatriene are used as a triplet quencher for rhodamine 6G dye lasers.

== See also ==
- Cyclopentadiene
- Cyclooctatetraene
- Benzene
