= Doyle–Kirmse reaction =

Reaction in organic chemistry

The Doyle–Kirmse reaction is an organic reaction in which a metal carbene reacts with an allyl compound with transposition of the alkene and transfer of the electronegative group from the allyl onto the carbene carbon.

As originally developed, an allyl sulfide reacts with trimethylsilyldiazomethane to form the homoallyl sulfide compound. The reaction was first reported by Wolfgang Kirmse in 1968 and modified by Michael P. Doyle in 1981.

The Kirmse protocol required a copper salt. The reaction mechanism involves nucleophilic addition of the sulfur to the metal carbene formed from the diazoalkane followed by a Stevens-like rearrangement.

Doyle expanded the scope of the reaction to include other diazo compounds, such as ethyl diazoacetate, other allyl compounds, such as allyl amines and allyl halides, and use of with rhodium catalysts, such as hexadecacarbonylhexarhodium. An example is the reaction of ethyl diazoacetate with allyl iodide:

The reaction can also be catalyzed by iron, palladium silver, and nickel. Modifications using other carbenes are reported e.g. (2-furyl)carbenoids.

The reaction is not strictly limited to allyl compounds. Propargyl-sulfide substrates give allene products and conversely allenyl-sulfide substrates give homopropargyl products.

Using metal catalysts that have chiral ligands leads to stereoselectivity of the newly-formed carbon–carbon bond.
