= C8H10N2O3S =

The molecular formula C_{8}H_{10}N_{2}O_{3}S (molar mass: 214.242 g/mol) may refer to:

- Diazald, or N-methyl-N-nitroso-p-toluenesulfonamide
- Sulfacetamide
