= C9H8N2O2 =

The molecular formula C_{9}H_{8}N_{2}O_{2} (molar mass: 176.17 g/mol, exact mass: 176.0586 u) may refer to:

- Methyl phenyldiazoacetate
- Pemoline
