= Kinamycin =

Group of chemical compounds

Chemical structure of kinamycin A

Kinamycins are a group of bacterial polyketide secondary metabolites containing a diazo group. Kinamycins are known for their cytotoxicity and are considered of interest for potential use in anti-cancer therapies.

== Synthesis ==
In 2006 and 2007 the means to totally and enantioselectively synthesize kinamycins C, F, and J were discovered. In 2010 a method was found to allow easier synthesis of these compounds in fewer steps, making research into their properties more feasible.
