= Carbene dimerization =

Reaction in organic chemistr

Carbene dimerization is a type of organic reaction in which two carbene or carbenoid precursors react in a formal dimerization to an alkene. This reaction is often considered an unwanted side-reaction but it is also investigated as a synthetic tool. In this reaction type either the two carbenic intermediates react or a carbenic intermediate reacts with a carbene precursor. An early pioneer was Christoph Grundmann reporting on a carbene dimerisation in 1938. In the domain of persistent carbenes the Wanzlick equilibrium describes an equilibrium between a carbene and its alkene.

A reoccurring substrate is a diazo compound and more specifically an alpha-carbonyl diazo compound. For example, ethyl diazoacetate is converted to diethyl maleate using the ruthenium catalyst chloro(cyclopentadienyl)bis(triphenylphosphine)ruthenium:

Grubbs' catalyst is also effective In this reaction type the active intermediate is a transition metal carbene complex. A diazo cross-coupling reaction has also been reported between ethyl diazoacetate and methyl phenyldiazoacetate using the rhodium catalyst [Rh_{2}(OPiv)_{4}].

A direct metal carbene dimerization has been used in the synthesis of novel Polyalkynylethenes
