= Trimethylsilyldiazomethane =

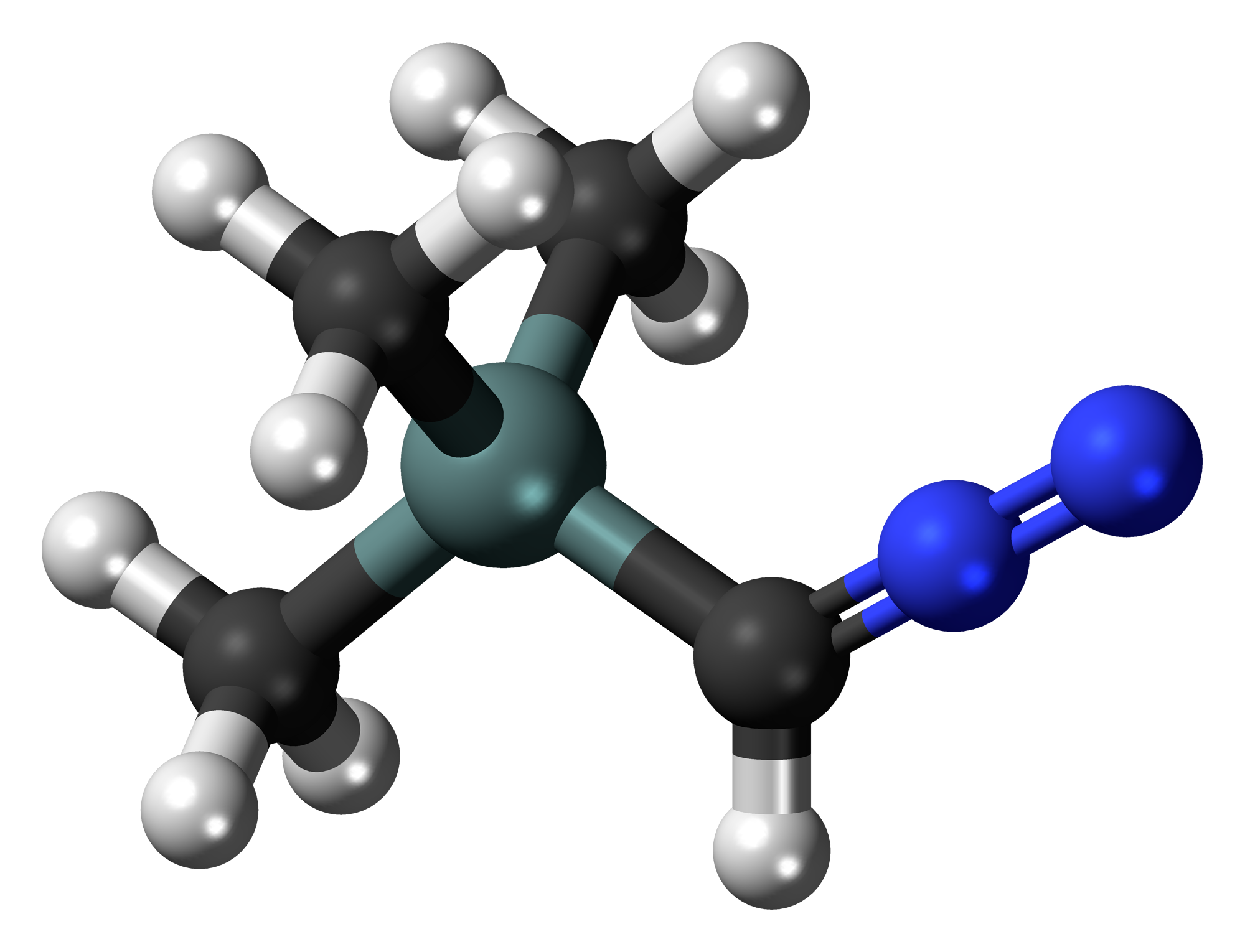

Names
- IUPAC name (Diazomethyl)trimethylsilane
- Other names Trimethylsilyldiazomethane; Diazo(trimethylsilyl)methane

Identifiers
CAS Number	18107-18-1
3D model (JSmol)	Interactive image; Interactive image
Beilstein Reference	1902903
ChemSpider	146699
ECHA InfoCard	100.131.243
EC Number	605-915-4
MeSH	Trimethylsilyldiazomethane
PubChem CID	167693
UNII	QI98HQO8C4
CompTox Dashboard (EPA)	DTXSID8074653
- InChI: InChI=1S/C4H10N2Si/c1-7(2,3)4-6-5/h4H,1-3H3 Key: ONDSBJMLAHVLMI-UHFFFAOYSA-N; InChI=1/C4H10N2Si/c1-7(2,3)4-6-5/h4H,1-3H3 Key: ONDSBJMLAHVLMI-UHFFFAOYAN
- SMILES: C[Si](C)(C)[CH-][N+]#N; [N-]=[N+]=C[Si](C)(C)C

Properties
Chemical formula	C_{4}H_{10}N_{2}Si
Molar mass	114.223 g·mol^{−1}
Appearance	greenish-yellow liquid
Boiling point	96.0 °C (204.8 °F; 369.1 K)

Hazards
- GHS labelling
Pictograms	(GHS02: Flammable) (GHS06: Toxic) (GHS08: Health hazard) (GHS09: Environmental hazard)
Signal word	Danger
Hazard statements	H330, H350, H370
Precautionary statements	P201, P202, P210, P233, P240, P241, P242, P243, P260, P264, P270, P271, P273, P280, P281, P284, P302+P352, P303+P361+P353, P304+P340, P307+P311, P308+P313, P310, P311, P314, P320, P332+P313, P362, P370+P378, P391, P403+P233, P403+P235, P405, P501
Safety data sheet (SDS)	External MSDS
- Except where otherwise noted, data are given for materials in their standard state (at 25 °C [77 °F], 100 kPa). verify (what is ?) Infobox references

Trimethylsilyldiazomethane is the organosilicon compound with the formula (CH_{3})_{3}SiCHN_{2}. It is classified as a diazo compound. Trimethylsilyldiazomethane is commercially available as solutions in hexanes, DCM, and ether. It is a specialized reagent used in organic chemistry as a methylating agent for carboxylic acids. It is a safer replacement for diazomethane, which is a sensitive explosive gas, whereas trimethylsilyldiazomethane is a relatively stable liquid and thus easier to handle.

== Preparation ==
Trimethylsilyldiazomethane can be prepared by treating (trimethylsilyl)methylmagnesium chloride with diphenyl phosphorazidate. An isotopically labelled variant, with ^{13}C at the diazomethyl carbon, is also known.

== Reactions ==
Trimethylsilyldiazomethane is useful for conversion of carboxylic acids to their methyl esters in high yield. The typical reaction conditions for this purpose use methanol as a cosolvent. Under these conditions, diazomethane itself is generated in situ as the active methylating agent, by an acid-catalyzed reaction between trimethylsilyldiazomethane and the alcohol with trimethylsilyloxymethane as byproduct:

$$\ce{CH3OH\ + TMSCHN2 ->[\ce{acid}] CH3OTMS\ + CH2N2}$$

When the methanol is omitted, substantial amounts of trimethylsilyl ester and trimethylmethyl ester products are formed as well.

It also reacts with alcohols to give methyl ethers, whereas diazomethane may not.

The compound is a reagent in the Doyle–Kirmse reaction with allyl sulfides and allyl amines.

Trimethylsilyldiazomethane is deprotonated by butyllithium:

(CH_{3})_{3}SiCHN_{2} + BuLi → (CH_{3})_{3}SiCLiN_{2} + BuH

The lithio compound is versatile. From it can be prepared other trimethylsilyldiazoalkanes:

(CH_{3})_{3}SiCLiN_{2} + RX → (CH_{3})_{3}SiCRN_{2} + LiX

(CH_{3})_{3}SiCLiN_{2} reacts with ketones and aldehydes to give, depending on the substituents, acetylenes.

== Applications ==
It has also been employed widely in tandem with GC-MS for the analysis of various carboxylic compounds which are ubiquitous in nature. The fact that the reaction is rapid and occurs readily makes it attractive. However, it can form artifacts which complicate spectral interpretation. Such artifacts are usually the trimethylsilylmethyl esters, RCO_{2}CH_{2}SiMe_{3}, formed when insufficient methanol is present. Acid-catalysed methanolysis is necessary to achieve near-quantitative yields of the desired methyl esters, RCO_{2}Me.

== Safety ==
Trimethylsilyldiazomethane is highly toxic. It has been implicated in the death of at least two chemists, a pharmaceutical worker in Windsor, Nova Scotia and one in Pennsylvania. Inhalation of diazomethane is known to cause pulmonary edema; trimethylsilyldiazomethane is suspected to behave similarly.

It is possible that upon contact with water on the surface of the lung, trimethylsilyldiazomethane converts to diazomethane.

Trimethylsilyldiazomethane is nonexplosive.
