= Methanesulfonyl azide =

Names
- Other names Mesyl azide

Identifiers
CAS Number	1516-70-7
3D model (JSmol)	Interactive image
Abbreviations	MsN_{3}
ChemSpider	483609
PubChem CID	556271
CompTox Dashboard (EPA)	DTXSID80339446
- InChI: InChI=1S/CH3N3O2S/c1-7(5,6)4-3-2/h1H3 Key: BHQIGUWUNPQBJY-UHFFFAOYSA-N
- SMILES: CS(=O)(=O)N=[N+]=[N-]

Properties
Chemical formula	CH_{3}N_{3}O_{2}S
Molar mass	121.11 g·mol^{−1}
Melting point	18 °C (64 °F; 291 K)
Boiling point	120 °C (248 °F; 393 K) decomposes
Solubility in water	Insoluble
Solubility	Ether, THF
- Except where otherwise noted, data are given for materials in their standard state (at 25 °C [77 °F], 100 kPa). Infobox references

Methanesulfonyl azide is the azide of methanesulfonic acid. It is used as a reagent for the production of diazo compounds.

== Preparation ==
Methanesulfonyl azide can be prepared from methanesulfonyl chloride by reaction with sodium azide in ethanol or methanol. Preparation in situ is also possible, for example in acetonitrile, which can reduce explosion hazards.

== Properties ==
Methanesulfonyl azide melts at 18 °C and decomposes at 120 °C. At low temperature, methanesulfonyl azide crystallizes in the triclinic crystal system in the space group P1 with lattice parameters a = 5.6240 Å; b = 5.9498 Å, c = 7.6329 Å, α = 72.216°, β = 70.897°, and γ = 88.601°, and two molecules per unit cell.

Mesyl azide is an antidote for hydrogen sulfide poisoning in mice.

== Reactions ==
Methanesulfonyl azide is part of the sulfonyl azides, a family of reagents for diazo transfer. Within this family, methanesulfonyl azide is particularly simple and inexpensive to produce, while the reaction mixture is straightforward to purify.

The photolysis of methanesulfonyl azide in a matrix of argon or neon yields a short-lived nitrene. If methanesulfonyl azide is irradiated in the presence of a hydrocarbon, it forms methanesulfonyl amide, as well as N-substituted derivatives through reactions with the hydrocarbon.

== Safety ==
Methanesulfonyl azide is fairly stable, but, like many other azides, it is toxic and still considered a potential explosive.
