= Elassovalene =

Names
- Preferred IUPAC name 2a,2a^{1}-Dihydrocyclopenta[cd]azulene

Identifiers
CAS Number	38310-40-6
3D model (JSmol)	Interactive image
ChemSpider	125478
PubChem CID	142246
UNII	5HK24EQ36P
CompTox Dashboard (EPA)	DTXSID60191680
- InChI: InChI=1S/C12H10/c1-2-4-10-6-8-11-7-5-9(3-1)12(10)11/h1-8,11-12H Key: HXHFTTRCEKEWIZ-UHFFFAOYSA-N
- SMILES: C1=CC=C2C=CC3C2C(=C1)C=C3

Properties
Chemical formula	C_{12}H_{10}
Molar mass	154.212 g·mol^{−1}
- Except where otherwise noted, data are given for materials in their standard state (at 25 °C [77 °F], 100 kPa). Infobox references

Elassovalene (2a,8b-dihydro-cyclopent[cd]azulene) is a polycyclic hydrocarbon with chemical formula C_{12}H_{10}, composed of one cycloheptatriene ring and two fused cyclopentene rings.

== See also ==
- List of chemical compounds with unusual names
- Azulene
- Homoaromaticity
