= Ring expansion and contraction =

Chemical phenomenon within ring systems

Ring expansion and ring contraction reactions expand or contract rings, usually in organic chemistry. The term usually refers to reactions involve making and breaking C-C bonds, Diverse pathways lead to these kinds of reactions. Many of these reactions are primarily of theoretical or pedagoogical interest, but some are very useful.

The bond migration step of the pinacol type rearrangement

== Ring expansions ==
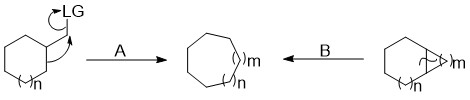
A scheme showing ring expansion by exocyclic bond migration (A) and ring opening of a bicyclic molecule (B).

Rings can be expanded by attack of the ring onto an outside group already appended to the ring (a migration/insertion), opening of a bicycle to a single larger ring, or coupling a ring closing with an expansion. These expansions can be further broken down by what type of atom they incorporate (a carbon or a heteroatom) into the expanded ring.

=== Carbon insertion through migration to an exocyclic group ===
These reactions have the general features of having an exocyclic leaving group on a carbon adjacent to the ring and an electron donating group on the ring capable of initiating a migration of an endocyclic bond.

A common migration introduction of carbon is a pinacol rearrangement. While this reaction refers specifically to a vicinal dihydroxide rearrangement, there are other pinacol type rearrangements that proceed through the same general mechanism such as the Tiffeneau–Demjanov rearrangement. These "semipinacol rearrangements" occur under milder conditions and are thus preferable in complex syntheses. These reactions are useful beyond simply expanding a ring because the exocyclic group attacked may also have other functionality appended to it besides the leaving group. The group to which the endocyclic bond migrates can also be selectively added to the ring based on the functionality already present, for example 1,2 addition into a cyclic ketone.

==== Carbon insertion through opening of a bicycle ====
A generalized mechanism of the Buchner ring expansion

A common method for expanding a ring involves opening cyclopropane-containing bicyclic intermediate. The strategy can start with a Simmons-Smith-like cyclopropanation of a cyclic alkene.

A related cyclopropane-based ring expansion is the Buchner ring expansion. The Buchner ring expansion is used to convert arenes to cycloheptatrienes. The Buchner ring expansion is encouraged to open to the desired product by placing electron withdrawing groups on the carbon added. In order to perform the ring opening on saturated bicyclic molecules the cyclopropane must be introduced such that a neighboring group can facilitate the expansion or the ring must be opened by attackate the expansion or the ring must be opened by attack from an outside group.

Ring opening as a means of ring expansion can also be applied to larger systems to give access to even larger ring syscyclization. The Grob fragmentation can be applied as an example of such an expansion. Like the pinacol type migration the Grob fragmentation relies on an electron donating group to promote the bond migration and encourage the leaving group to be expelled. In this case the electron donating group can be a pseudo electron donating group which is capable of eliminating and donating an electron pair into the carbon with the breaking bond. Working with two smaller rings can allow for elaboration of two parts of the molecule separately before working with the expanded ring. The Dowd-Beckwith ring expansion reaction is also capable of adding several carbons to a ring at a time, and is a useful tool for making large rings. While it proceeds through an intermediate bicycle the final cyclization and ring opening take place within the same radical reaction. This expansion is useful because it allows the expansion of a beta-ketoester to a large cyclic ketone which can easily be elaborated using either the cyclic ketone or the exocyclic ester.

=== Heteroatom insertion reactions ===
Some heterocycles can be made through ring expansions.

==== Beckmann rearrangement ====
World demand for caprolactam was estimated to reach five million tons per year for 2015. It has been estimated that 90% of all caprolactam is synthesised from cyclohexanone (1), which is first converted to its oxime. Treatment of this oxime with acid induces the Beckmann rearrangement to give caprolactam:

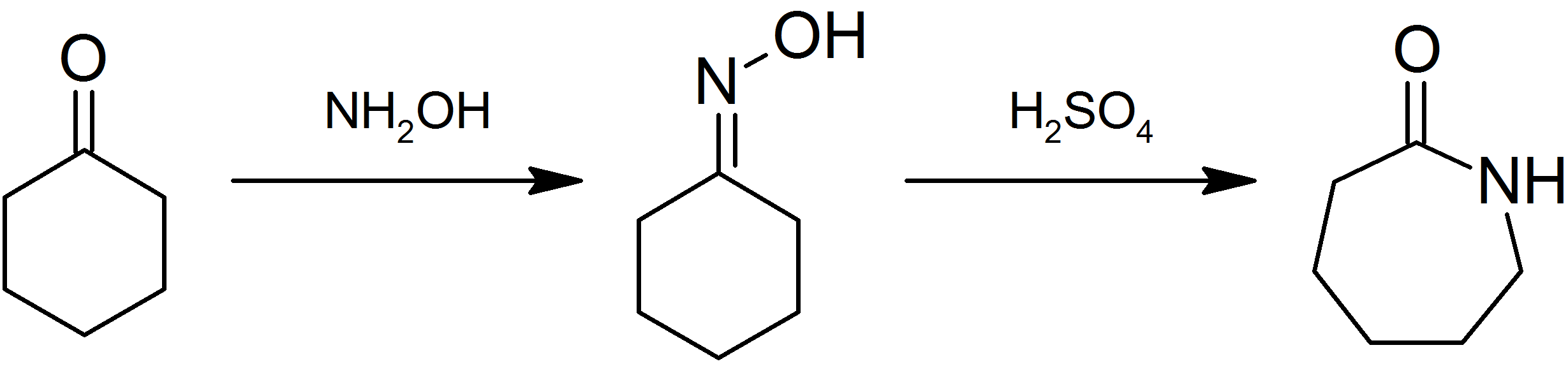

The Beckmann rearrangement has also been used for the introduction of nitrogen into codeine.

==== Other N-insertions ====
A minor industrial route involves the treatment of cyclohexanecarboxylic acid with nitrosylsulfuric acid (the Snia Viscosa process). This is thought to proceed via a ketene.

At bench scale, the reaction between cyclohexanone with hydrazoic acid gives caprolactam in the Schmidt reaction.

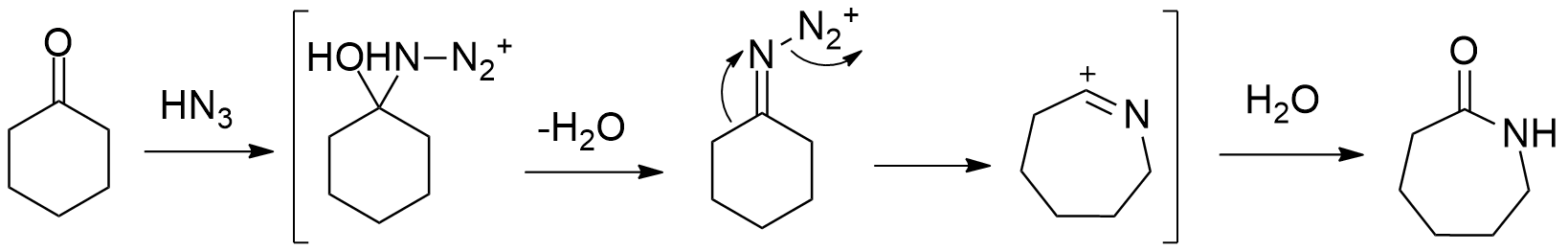

==== Baeyer-Villiger oxidation ====
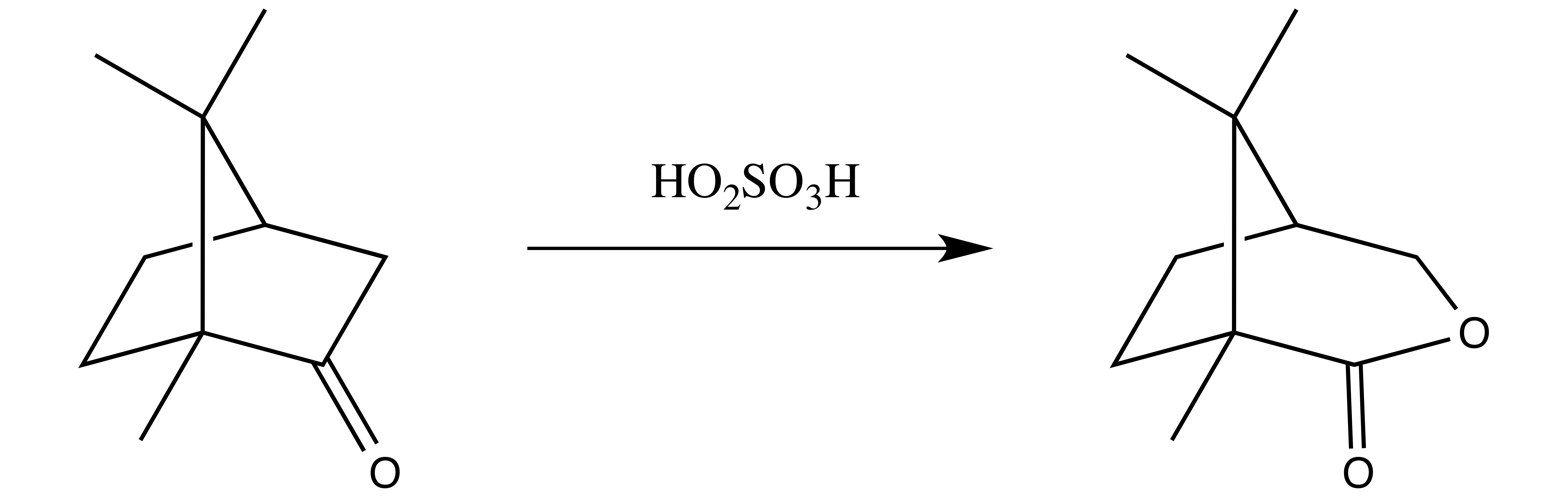
Baeyer-Villiger oxidation of camphor.

In the Baeyer-Villiger oxidation an O atom is introduced into a ring.

== Ring contractions ==
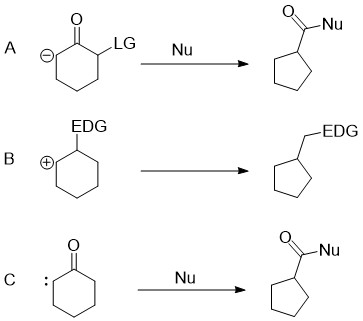
Ring contraction through anionic (A), cationic (B), and carbenoid (C) reactive intermediates.

Ring contractions are useful for making smaller, more strained rings from larger rings. The impetus for making these rings comes from the difficulty associated with making a fully elaborated small ring when such a ring could more easily be made from an elaborated larger ring, from which an atom can be excised, or that the original larger scaffold is more accessible.

Ring contractions proceed via anionic, cationic, and carbenoid intermediates.

=== Carbenoid ring contractions ===
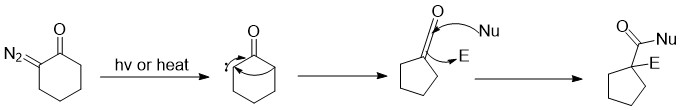
Mechanism of the Wolff rearrangement used to give a ring contracted product

In the Arndt–Eistert reaction, an α-diazoketone is induced to release N_{2}, resulting in a highly reactive sextet carbon center adjacent to the carbonyl. Such species convert by a Wolff rearrangement to give an ester in the presence of alcohols. When applied to cyclic α-diazoketones, ring contraction occurs. In the case of steroids, this reaction has been used to convert cyclopentanone groups to cyclobutanyl derivatives.

=== Favorskii rearrangement ===
The Favorskii rearrangement is a classic anionic ring contraction. It proceeds through a carbanion that attacks an endocyclic carbon and expels a leaving group (a halide) forming a bicyclic molecule with rings smaller than the original. The bicycle is then opened by nucleophilic attack on the ketone to give the contracted product. This reaction has been used to convert cyclohexanone to the methyl ester of cyclopentanecarboxylic acid

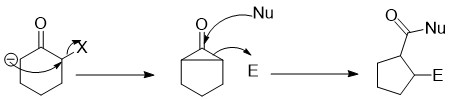
A generalized mechanism of the Favorskii rearrangement to give a ring contracted product. Note that anion formation has been omitted.

An alternative to the standard Favorskii rearrangement, is to perform what can be thought of as a negative pinacol rearrangement where an anionic group encourages a bond aligned with a leaving group to migrate and expel the leaving group, which has been used in several syntheses. It should also be noted that the so-called "quasi-Favorskii rearrangement" proceeds without an additional nucleophile to form the final contracted product.

A general pinacol type rearrangement to an unequal 5,7 ring system

=== Cation contractions ===
The cationic rearrangement contraction proceeds through the loss of a leaving group and the migration of an endocyclic bond to the carbocation. Pinacol type rearrangements are often used for this type of contraction. Like the expansion reaction this proceeds with an electron donating group aiding in the migration.

Contraction reactions of one ring can be coupled with an expansion of another to give an unequal bicycle from equally sized fused ring. These cationic rearrangements have found use to synthesize the cores of complex molecules.

== Expansions and contractions ==
The Demyanov ring contraction and expansion entails diazotization of aminocyclobutanes and aminocyclopropanes. Loss of N_{2} from the diazo cations results in secondary carbocations, which tend to rearrange and then undergo hydrolysis. The reaction converts aminocyclobutane into a mixture of hydroxycyclobutane and hydroxymethylcyclopropane. These reactions produce an equilibrating mixture of two carbocations:

C_{4}H^{+}_{7} ⇌ C_{3}H_{5}CH^{+}_{2}

== Inorganic and organometallic examples ==
Ring expansion reaction of cyclopropane by formation of metallacycle of Pt(IV).

Ring expansion and contraction reactions are common for transition metal complexes.
