= Methyl phenylacetate =

- Skeletal formula of methyl phenylacetate

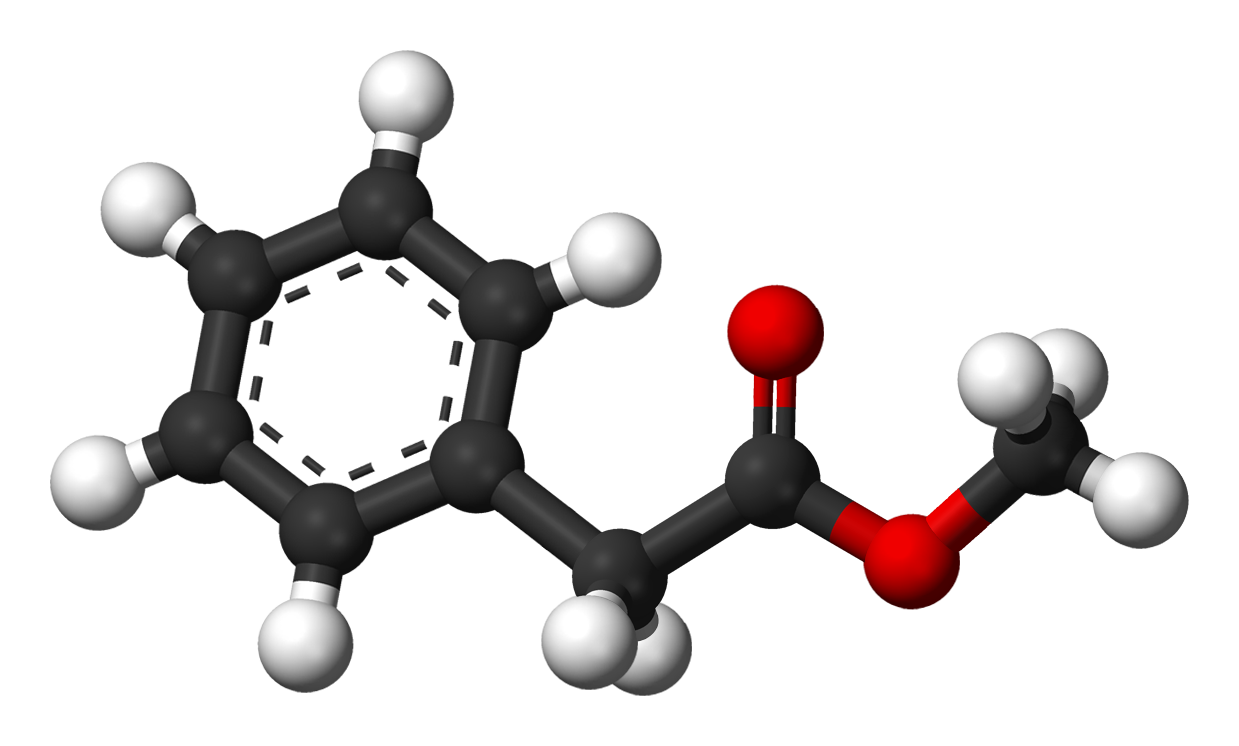
- Ball-and-stick model

Names
- Preferred IUPAC name Methyl phenylacetate
- Other names Methyl 2-phenylacetate Methyl benzene acetate

Identifiers
CAS Number	101-41-7
3D model (JSmol)	Interactive image
Beilstein Reference	878795
ChemSpider	7278
ECHA InfoCard	100.002.674
EC Number	202-940-9
MeSH	C024906
PubChem CID	7559
UNII	D4PDC41X96
CompTox Dashboard (EPA)	DTXSID1044352
- InChI: InChI=1S/C9H10O2/c1-11-9(10)7-8-5-3-2-4-6-8/h2-6H,7H2,1H3 Key: CRZQGDNQQAALAY-UHFFFAOYSA-N; InChI=1/C9H10O2/c1-11-9(10)7-8-5-3-2-4-6-8/h2-6H,7H2,1H3 Key: CRZQGDNQQAALAY-UHFFFAOYAC
- SMILES: COC(=O)CC1=CC=CC=C1

Properties
Chemical formula	C_{9}H_{10}O_{2}
Molar mass	150.1745 g mol^{−1}
Appearance	Colorless liquid
Density	1.055±0.060 g/cm^{3}
Melting point	50 °C (122 °F; 323 K)
Boiling point	218 °C (424 °F; 491 K)
Solubility in water	2070 mg/L
Vapor pressure	17.3 Pa
Magnetic susceptibility (χ)	−92.73×10^{−6} cm^{3}/mol
Refractive index (n_{D})	1.505±0.020 at 20 °C

Hazards
NFPA 704 (fire diamond)	1 2 0
Flash point	90.6 °C (195.1 °F; 363.8 K)
- Except where otherwise noted, data are given for materials in their standard state (at 25 °C [77 °F], 100 kPa). verify (what is ?) Infobox references

Methyl phenylacetate is an organic compound that is the methyl ester of phenylacetic acid, with the structural formula C_{6}H_{5}CH_{2}CO_{2}CH_{3}. It is a colorless liquid that is only slightly soluble in water, but soluble in most organic solvents.

Methyl phenylacetate has a strong odor similar to honey. This compound also occurs in brandy, capsicum, coffee, honey, pepper, and some wine. It is used in the flavor industry and in perfumes to impart honey scents.

Methyl phenyldiazoacetate, precursor to cyclopropanation agents, is prepared by treating methyl phenylacetate with p-acetamidobenzenesulfonyl azide in the presence of base.
