= Diazoalkane 1,3-dipolar cycloaddition =

Reaction in organic chemistry

The Diazoalkane 1,3-dipolar cycloaddition is a 1,3-dipolar cycloaddition (an organic reaction) between a 1,3-dipole diazo compound (notably diazomethane) and a dipolarophile. When the dipolarophile is an alkene, the reaction product is a pyrazoline.

The reaction product of a cycloaddition between diazomethane and trans-diethyl glutaconate is a 1-pyrazoline. This reaction is 100% regioselective because the diazo terminal nitrogen atom bonds exclusively to the alpha-carbon of the ester. The reaction is also a syn addition, and the configuration in the dipolarophile is preserved. The 1-pyrazoline is unstable and isomerizes to the 2-pyrazoline due to favorable conjugation with the ester group.

With diazo(phenyl)methane as the reactant the regioselectivity is reversed and the reaction is extended even further by simple air organic oxidation of the 2-pyrazoline to the pyrazole.

Diazoalkane 1,3-dipolar cycloaddition.

Another example of a diazo cycloaddition is a diazo-thioketone coupling.
