= Diazald =

Names
- Preferred IUPAC name N,4-Dimethyl-N-nitrosobenzene-1-sulfonamide
- Other names N-Methyl-N-nitroso-4-methylbenzenesulfonamide; N-Methyl-N-nitroso-p-toluenesulphonamide; N-Methyl-N-nitroso-4-methylbenzenesulphonamide

Identifiers
CAS Number	80-11-5
3D model (JSmol)	Interactive image
ChemSpider	6376
ECHA InfoCard	100.001.139
EC Number	201-252-6
MeSH	C418734
PubChem CID	6628
UNII	K3089966LA
CompTox Dashboard (EPA)	DTXSID8058827
- InChI: InChI=1S/C8H10N2O3S/c1-7-3-5-8(6-4-7)14(12,13)10(2)9-11/h3-6H,1-2H3 Key: FFKZOUIEAHOBHW-UHFFFAOYSA-N; InChI=1/C8H10N2O3S/c1-7-3-5-8(6-4-7)14(12,13)10(2)9-11/h3-6H,1-2H3 Key: FFKZOUIEAHOBHW-UHFFFAOYAJ
- SMILES: Cc1ccc(cc1)S(=O)(=O)N(C)N=O

Properties
Chemical formula	C_{8}H_{10}N_{2}O_{3}S
Molar mass	214.24 g·mol^{−1}
Appearance	Light yellow solid
Melting point	61–62 °C (142–144 °F; 334–335 K)

Hazards
- Occupational safety and health (OHS/OSH)
Main hazards	Skin sensitiser, irritant, explosive
NFPA 704 (fire diamond)	2 0 3
Safety data sheet (SDS)	External MSDS
- Except where otherwise noted, data are given for materials in their standard state (at 25 °C [77 °F], 100 kPa). Infobox references

Diazald (N-methyl-N-nitroso-p-toluenesulfonamide) is used as a relatively safe and easily handled precursor to diazomethane, which is toxic and unstable. Since its introduction in 1954, Diazald has become the favored commercially available precursor for the synthesis of diazomethane, compared to reagents like N-methyl-N-nitrosourea and N-methyl-N'-nitro-N-nitrosoguanidine, which are less thermally stable and more toxic and mutagenic, respectively.

Upon the addition of a base such as sodium hydroxide or potassium hydroxide and mild heating (65–70 °C) in a mixture of water, diethyl ether, and a high boiling polar cosolvent (e.g., diethylene glycol monomethyl ether), the N-nitrososulfonamide undergoes successive elimination reactions to produce diazomethane (which is codistilled as an ethereal solution) as well as a p-toluenesulfonate salt as a byproduct, according to the following mechanism: (Note: Black (1983) and Brückner (2010) instead suggest a mechanism involving a 1,3-shift to form a toluenesulfonyl diazoate, followed by 1,3-elimination.)

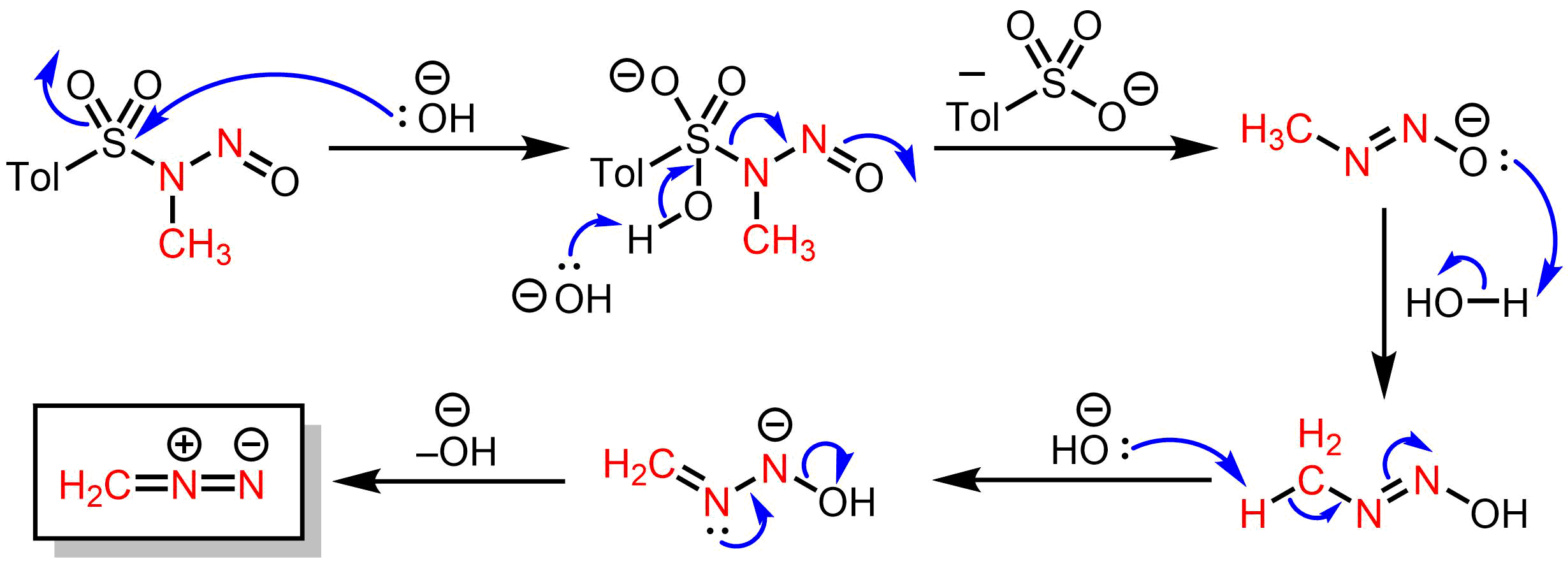

Like other nitroso compounds, it is thermally sensitive, as a result of its weak N–NO bond whose bond dissociation energy was measured to be 33.4 kcal/mol.
