= Isodiazomethane =

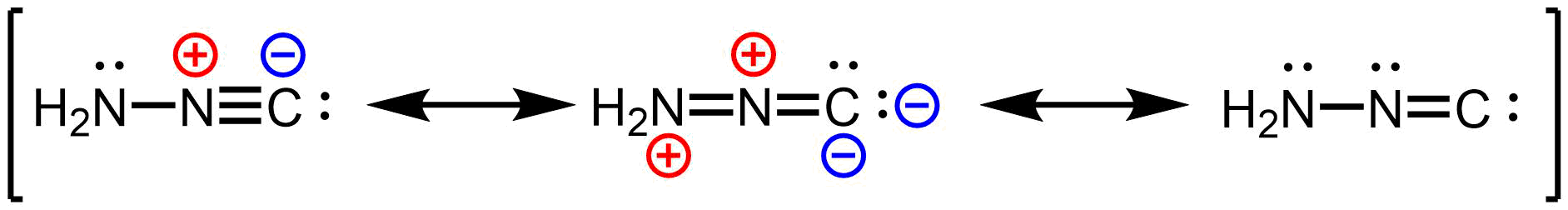
- Resonance forms of isodiazomethane

Identifiers
CAS Number	4702-38-9
3D model (JSmol)	Interactive image
ChemSpider	19474507
PubChem CID	20684874
CompTox Dashboard (EPA)	DTXSID801317917
- InChI: InChI=1S/CH2N2/c1-3-2/h2H2 Key: DOIJUTUOUQGQPQ-UHFFFAOYSA-N
- SMILES: [C-]#[N+]N

Properties
Chemical formula	CH_{2}N_{2}
Molar mass	42.041 g·mol^{−1}
- Except where otherwise noted, data are given for materials in their standard state (at 25 °C [77 °F], 100 kPa). Infobox references

In organic chemistry, isodiazomethane, also known as isocyanamide, aminoisonitrile, or systematically as isocyanoamine, is the parent compound of a class of derivatives of general formula R_{2}N–NC. It has the condensed formula H_{2}N–N^{+}≡C^{–}, making it an isomer of diazomethane. It is prepared by protonating an ethereal solution of lithiodiazomethane, LiCHN_{2}, with aqueous NaH_{2}PO_{4} or NH_{4}Cl. The parent compound is only marginally stable at room temperature and is isolated by removal of solvent at –50 °C. Derivatives are generally prepared by dehydration of the corresponding substituted formylhydrazine with COCl_{2} and Et_{3}N.

Earlier, the compound was misidentified as the isomeric nitrilimine, HN^{–}–N^{+}≡CH. However, this structure was disproven by ^{1}H NMR studies, which show a compound with a single signal at δ 6.40 ppm in (CD_{3}CD_{2})_{2}O instead of two signals expected for nitrilimine. Moreover, an infrared band at 2140 cm^{−1} was assigned to the isocyano group. Transition metal complexes of isodiazomethane have been prepared. In bulk form isodiazomethane is a liquid which decomposes when the temperature exceeds 15 °C. If it is heated to 40 °C, the substance explodes. A solution of isodiazomethane in diethyl ether at –30 °C gradually isomerizes to diazomethane upon exposure to sodium hydroxide for 20 min.

Microwave spectroscopy indicates that unlike diazomethane, isodiazomethane is not completely planar, with the amino nitrogen undergoing inversion. An ab initio study indicated that there is some N–N double bond character in H_{2}N–N≡C, although less so than in the N–C bond of H_{2}N–C≡N. Like other isocyanide derivatives and carbon monoxide, its primary resonance form carries a negative charge and lone pair on carbon, a comparatively rare situation for neutral molecules. A resonance form with zero formal charge on all atoms also has some importance; however, the carbon atom only has a sextet of electrons and is formally a carbene.
