= Methylnitronitrosoguanidine =

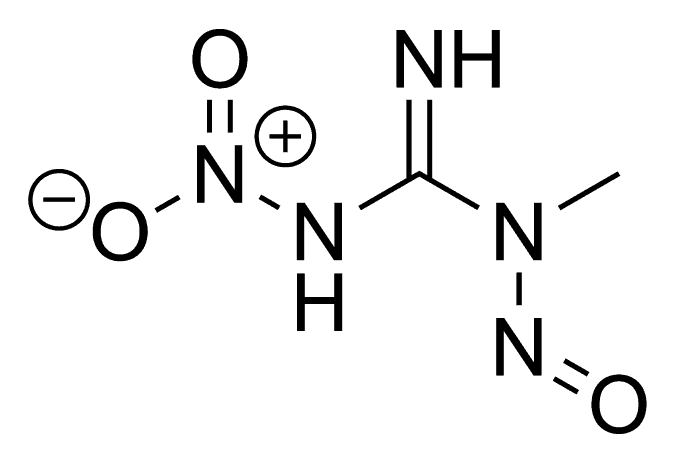

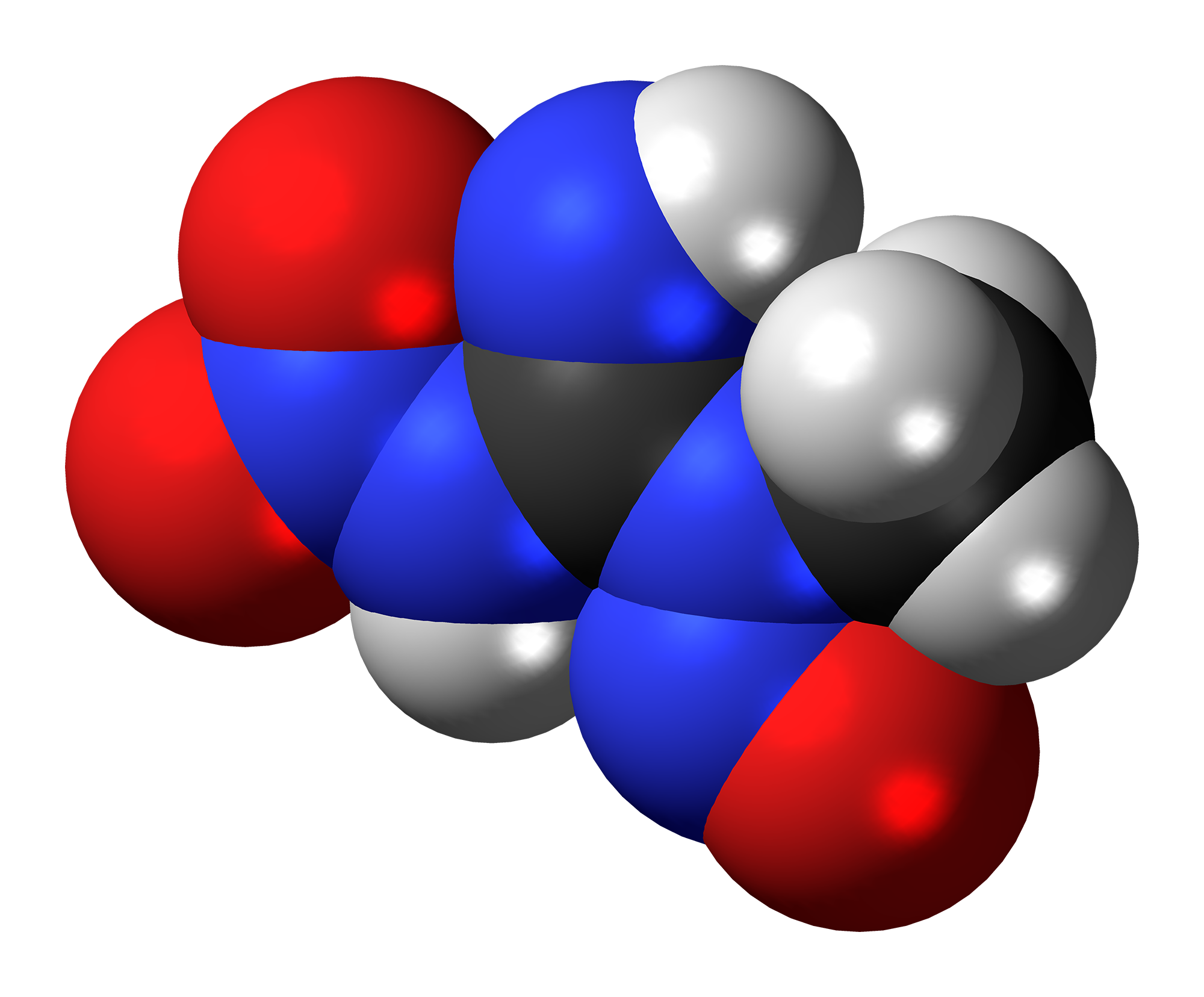

Names
- Preferred IUPAC name N-Methyl-N′-nitro-N-nitrosoguanidine
- Other names 1-Methyl-3-nitro-1-nitrosoguanidine; N-Methyl-N-nitroso-N′-nitroguanidine

Identifiers
CAS Number	70-25-7
3D model (JSmol)	Interactive image
Abbreviations	MNNG
ChemSpider	6025
ECHA InfoCard	100.000.664
KEGG	C14592
PubChem CID	6261
UNII	12H3O2UGSF
CompTox Dashboard (EPA)	DTXSID2020846
- InChI: InChI=1S/C2H5N5O3/c1-6(5-8)2(3)4-7(9)10/h1H3,(H2,3,4) Key: VZUNGTLZRAYYDE-UHFFFAOYSA-N; InChI=1/C2H5N5O3/c1-6(5-8)2(3)4-7(9)10/h1H3,(H2,3,4) Key: VZUNGTLZRAYYDE-UHFFFAOYAT
- SMILES: CN(C(=N[N+](=O)[O-])N)N=O

Properties
Chemical formula	C_{2}H_{5}N_{5}O_{3}
Molar mass	147.09 g/mol
Appearance	Yellow crystals
Melting point	118 °C (244 °F; 391 K) (decomposes)
Solubility in water	reacts violently, slowly hydrolysed
- Except where otherwise noted, data are given for materials in their standard state (at 25 °C [77 °F], 100 kPa). verify (what is ?) Infobox references

Methylnitronitrosoguanidine (MNNG or MNG, NTG when referred to colloquially as nitrosoguanidine) is a biochemical tool used experimentally as a carcinogen and mutagen. It acts by adding alkyl groups to the O^{6} of guanine and O^{4} of thymine, which can lead to transition mutations between GC and AT. These changes do not cause a heavy distortion in the double helix of DNA and thus are hard to detect by the DNA mismatch repair system.

In organic chemistry, MNNG is used as a source of diazomethane when reacted with aqueous potassium hydroxide.

MNNG is a probable human carcinogen listed as an IARC Group 2A carcinogen.

== Stability ==
MNNG produces diazomethane, a known methylating agent of DNA and other substrates, in basic aqueous solutions, and nitrous acid, a mutagen, in acidic solutions.
