= Methyl phenyldiazoacetate =

Names
- Preferred IUPAC name Methyl diazo(phenyl)acetate

Identifiers
CAS Number	22979-35-7
3D model (JSmol)	Interactive image
ChemSpider	10708515
PubChem CID	53436974
UNII	GV2N699A75
CompTox Dashboard (EPA)	DTXSID50700982
- InChI: InChI=1S/C9H8N2O2/c1-13-9(12)8(11-10)7-5-3-2-4-6-7/h2-6H,1H3 Key: HYAAEBUKCXOFDT-UHFFFAOYSA-N
- SMILES: COC(=O)C(=[N+]=[N-])C1=CC=CC=C1

Properties
Chemical formula	C_{9}H_{8}N_{2}O_{2}
Molar mass	176.175 g·mol^{−1}
Appearance	Yellow oil
Solubility in alkanes	Soluble
- Except where otherwise noted, data are given for materials in their standard state (at 25 °C [77 °F], 100 kPa). Infobox references

Methyl phenyldiazoacetate is the organic compound with the formula C_{6}H_{5}C(N_{2})CO_{2}Me. It is a diazo derivative of methyl phenylacetate. Colloquially referred to as "phenyldiazoacetate", it is generated and used in situ after isolation as a yellow oil.

Methyl phenyldiazoacetate and many related derivatives are precursors to donor-acceptor carbenes, which can be used for cyclopropanation or to insert into C-H bonds of organic substrates. These reactions are catalyzed by dirhodium tetraacetate or related chiral complexes. Methyl phenyldiazoacetate is prepared by treating methyl phenylacetate with p-acetamidobenzenesulfonyl azide in the presence of base.

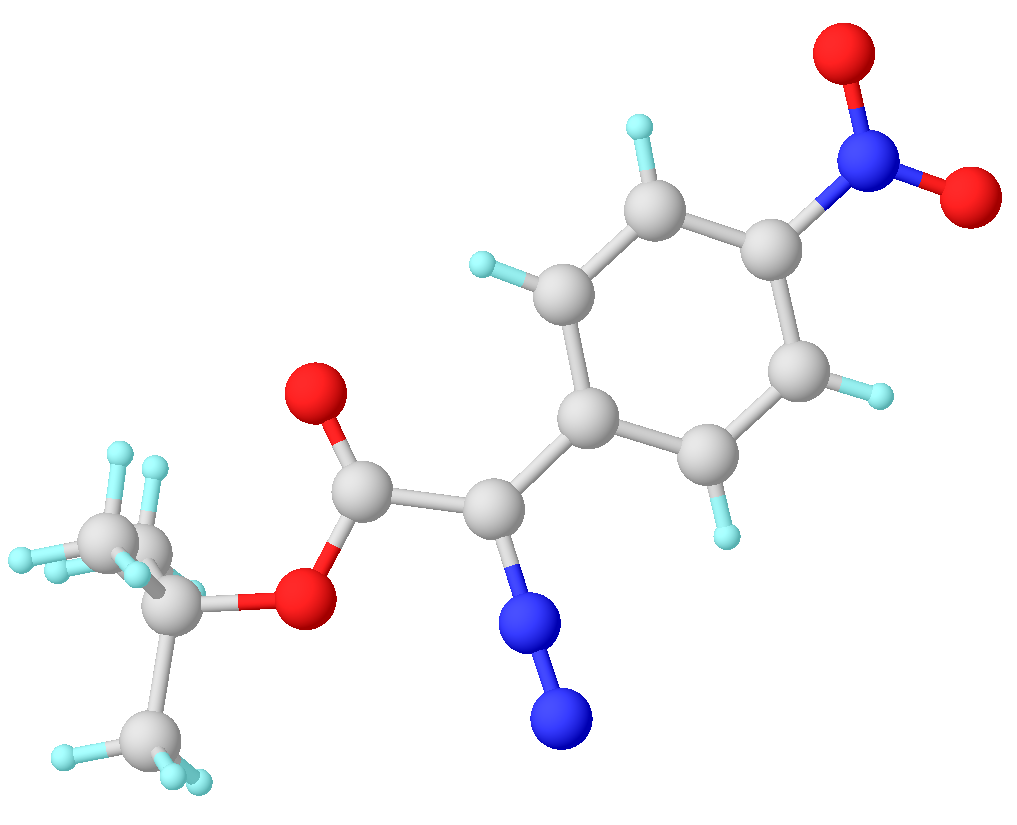
Solid state structure of tert-butyl diazo(4-nitrophenyl)acetate t-BuO_{2}CC(N_{2})C_{6}H_{4}NO_{2}, a representative of donor-acceptor carbene precursor related to the title compound. Key distances: C-N = 1.329 Å, N-N = 1.121 Å.
