= Ethyl diazoacetate =

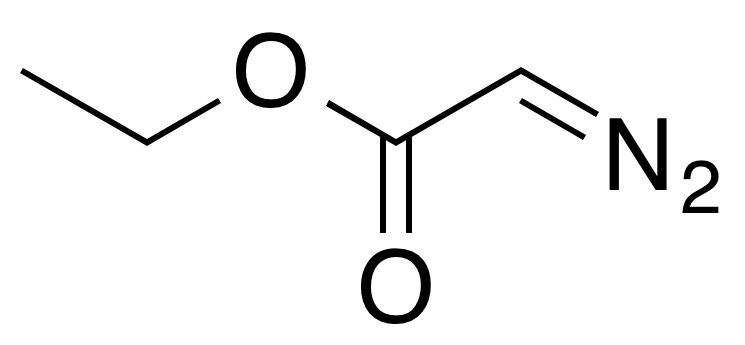

Names
- Preferred IUPAC name Ethyl diazoacetate
- Other names Ethyl 2-diazoacetate 2-Diazoacetic acid ethyl ester

Identifiers
CAS Number	623-73-4
3D model (JSmol)	Interactive image
ChemSpider	11692
ECHA InfoCard	100.009.828
EC Number	210-810-8
PubChem CID	12192
UNII	N84B835FMR
CompTox Dashboard (EPA)	DTXSID10878732
- InChI: InChI=1S/C4H6N2O2/c1-2-8-4(7)3-6-5/h3H,2H2,1H3 Key: YVPJCJLMRRTDMQ-UHFFFAOYSA-N; InChI=1/C4H6N2O2/c1-2-8-4(7)3-6-5/h3H,2H2,1H3 Key: YVPJCJLMRRTDMQ-UHFFFAOYAC
- SMILES: CCOC(=O)C=[N+]=[N-]

Properties
Chemical formula	C_{4}H_{6}N_{2}O_{2}
Molar mass	114.10 g/mol
Appearance	yellow oil
Density	1.085 g/cm^{3}
Melting point	−22 °C (−8 °F; 251 K)
Boiling point	140 to 141 °C (284 to 286 °F; 413 to 414 K) 720 mmHg

Hazards
- GHS labelling
Pictograms	(GHS02: Flammable) (GHS07: Exclamation mark) (GHS08: Health hazard) (GHS01: Explosive)
Signal word	Danger
Hazard statements	H226, H240, H302, H315, H320, H351
Precautionary statements	P281, P305+P351+P338, P501
NFPA 704 (fire diamond)	2 2 0
Safety data sheet (SDS)	Ethyl diazoacetate
- Except where otherwise noted, data are given for materials in their standard state (at 25 °C [77 °F], 100 kPa). verify (what is ?) Infobox references

Ethyl diazoacetate (N=N=CHC(O)OC_{2}H_{5}) is a diazo compound and a reagent in organic chemistry. It was discovered by Theodor Curtius in 1883. The compound can be prepared by reaction of the ethyl ester of glycine with sodium nitrite and sodium acetate in water.

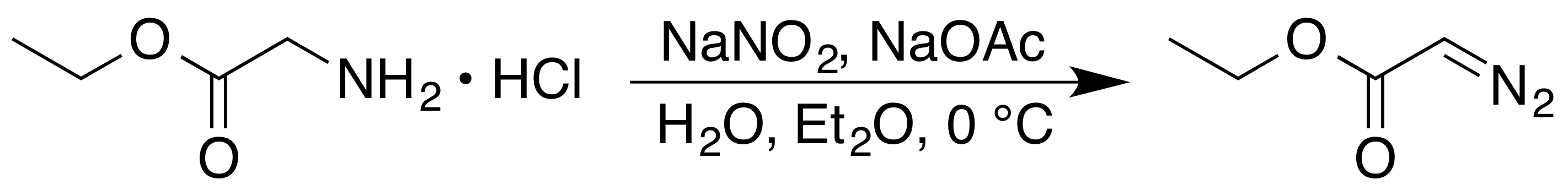

As a carbene precursor, it is used in the cyclopropanation of alkenes.

Although the compound is hazardous, it is used in chemical industry as a precursor to trovafloxacin. Procedures for safe industrial handling have been published.
