= Skattebøl =

Skattebøl may refer to:

== People ==
- Lars Skattebøl (born 1927), Norwegian scientist
- Ole Larsen Skattebøl (1844–1929), Norwegian judge and politician

== Other uses ==
- Skattebøl rearrangement, organic reaction
