= William von Eggers Doering =

American chemist (1917–2011)

- Born: June 22, 1917; Fort Worth, Texas, United States
- Died: January 3, 2011 (aged 93); Waltham, Massachusetts
- Education: Harvard University
- Known for: Synthesis of quinine with Woodward, contributions to physical organic chemistry
- Awards: ACS Award in Pure Chemistry (1953) James Flack Norris Award in Physical Organic Chemistry (1989) Welch Award (1990)
- Scientific career
- Fields: Organic chemistry
- Workplaces: Harvard University, Columbia University, Yale University
- Doctoral advisor: Sir Reginald Patrick Linstead
- Doctoral students: Kenneth Wiberg, Andrew Streitwieser, Maitland Jones, Jr., Charles DePuy

William von Eggers Doering (June 22, 1917 – January 3, 2011) was the Mallinckrodt Professor of Chemistry at Harvard University. Before Harvard, he taught at Columbia (1942–1952) and Yale (1952–1968).

Doering was born in Fort Worth, Texas to academics Carl Rupp Doering and Antoinette Mathilde von Eggers, both of whom were professors at Texas Christian University. His maternal great-uncle was the prominent German financier and economist Hjalmar Schacht, sometime President of the Reichsbank and cabinet minister in Nazi Germany.

Doering was an undergraduate at Harvard University, where he took courses with some of the leading organic chemists at the time, including Louis Fieser and Paul Doughty Bartlett. He stayed at Harvard for his graduate education, where he studied catalytic hydrogenation under Reginald Linstead, completing his PhD in 1943. Before beginning his independent career, he became famous for completing a (formal) quinine total synthesis with Robert Burns Woodward as a postdoctoral scholar, a wartime achievement that was publicized at the time by the national news media, including TIME magazine. Subsequently, during an independent career at Columbia, Yale, and Harvard that spanned over half a century, he made numerous contributions to the field of physical organic chemistry.

Having published his first scientific paper in 1939 and his last in 2008, he holds the rare distinction of having authored scholarly articles in eight different decades. In 1989, he received the "James Flack Norris Award in Physical Organic Chemistry" of the American Chemical Society and in 1990 the Robert A. Welch Award in Chemistry.

Some of his major contributions include recognition of the aromatic nature of the tropylium cation and the early use of ^{1}H NMR for the characterization of carbocations and other reactive intermediates, including heptamethylbenzenium cation, investigation of the stereochemistry of the Cope rearrangement, and pioneering work in carbene chemistry, including the discovery of dichlorocarbene. Some other notable work include the synthesis of fulvalene, the discoveries of the Doering-LaFlamme allene synthesis and the Parikh-Doering oxidation, prediction of the existence of bullvalene as a fluxional molecule, and elucidation of the mechanism of the Baeyer–Villiger oxidation. Together with H. H. Zeiss, he proposed the Doering-Zeiss mechanistic hypothesis for solvolysis reactions. He first articulated the notion that cyclic systems with (4n + 2) π-electrons exhibit aromatic stability (the modern form of Hückel's rule) and coined the term "carbene" in collaboration with Woodward and Winstein during a nocturnal cab ride in Chicago.

Doering became emeritus in 1986, but continued to advise graduate students and publish.
