= Carbene =

Organic molecule containing a neutral carbon with two unbound valence electrons

Methylene is the simplest carbene.

In organic chemistry, a carbene is a molecule containing a neutral carbon atom with a valence of two and two unshared valence electrons. The general formula is R−:C−R' or R=C: where the R represents substituents or hydrogen atoms.

The term "carbene" may also refer to the specific compound :CH_{2}, also called methylene, the parent hydride from which all other carbene compounds are formally derived.

There are two types of carbenes: singlets or triplets, depending upon their electronic structure. The different classes undergo different reactions.

Most carbenes are extremely reactive, transient intermediates whose intermediacy is inferred through mechanistic experiments. A small number (e.g., dihalocarbenes, carbon monosulfide) can be isolated (sometimes only at low temperatures), and can stabilize as metal ligands, but otherwise cannot be stored in bulk. A handful of persistent carbenes (including carbon monoxide, isocyanides, and some N-heterocyclic carbenes) are indefinitely stable and have extensive application in modern organometallic chemistry.

== Generation ==
There are two common methods for carbene generation: α-elimination and small-molecule extrusion.

=== α-Elimination ===
In α elimination, two substituents eliminate from the same carbon atom. α-Elimination typically occurs when strong bases act on acidic protons with no good vicinal leaving groups. For example, phenyllithium will abstract HX from a haloform (CHX_{3}). Such reactions also often employ aqueous base under phase-transfer conditions (e.g., conc. aq. NaOH, CHBr_{3}, and [BnNMe_{3}]^{+}Br^{–}).

Molecules with no acidic proton can still be induced to α-eliminate. A geminal dihalide exposed to organolithiums can undergo metal-halogen exchange and then eliminate a lithium salt:

R_{2}CBr_{2} + BuLi → R_{2}CLi(Br) + BuBr
R_{2}CLi(Br) → R_{2}C + LiBr

Zinc metal abstracts halogens similarly in the Simmons–Smith reaction.

Mercuric and organomercury halides (except fluorides) can stably "store" a wide variety carbenes as the α-halomercury adduct until a mild thermolysis. For example, the "Seyferth reagent" releases CCl_{2} upon heating:

C_{6}H_{5}HgCCl_{3} → "CCl_{2}" + C_{6}H_{5}HgCl

It remains uncertain which (if any) of such metallated reagents form truly free carbenes, instead of a reactive metal-carbene complex. Nevertheless, reactions with such metallocarbenes generally give the same organic products as with other carbene sources.

=== Small-molecule extrusion ===
Separately, carbenes can be produced from an extrusion reaction with a large free energy change. Diazirines and epoxides photolyze to carbenes in a tremendous release of ring strain, the former with nitrogen gas coproduct. Epoxides typically give reactive carbonyl wastes, and asymmetric epoxides can potentially form two different carbenes. Typically, the C-O bond with lesser fractional bond order (fewer double-bond resonance structures) breaks. For example, when one substituent is alkyl and another aryl, the aryl-substituted carbon is usually released as a carbene fragment.

Ring strain is not necessary for a strong thermodynamic driving force. Photolysis, heat, or transition metal catalysts (typically rhodium and copper) decompose diazoalkanes to a carbene and gaseous nitrogen; such are the Bamford–Stevens reaction and Wolff rearrangement. As with metallocarbenes, some reactions of diazoalkanes that formally proceed via carbenes may instead form a [3+2] cycloadduct intermediate that extrudes nitrogen.

To generate an alkylidene carbene a ketone can be exposed to trimethylsilyldiazomethane and then a strong base:

== Structures and bonding ==
Singlet and triplet carbenes

The two classes of carbenes are singlet and triplet carbenes. Triplet carbenes are diradicals with two unpaired electrons, typically form from reactions that break two σ bonds (α elimination and some extrusion reactions), and do not rehybridize the carbene atom. Singlet carbenes have a single lone pair, typically form from diazo decompositions, and adopt an sp^{2} orbital structure. Bond angles (as determined by EPR) are 125–140° for triplet methylene and 102° for singlet methylene.

Most carbenes have a nonlinear triplet ground state. For simple hydrocarbons, triplet carbenes are usually only 8 kcal/mol (33 kJ/mol) more stable than singlet carbenes, comparable to nitrogen inversion. The stabilization is in part attributed to Hund's rule of maximum multiplicity. Only few persistent triplet carbenes are known, either stabilized by a metal substituent such as lead, palladium or platinum (metalla-carbenes), or two aryl groups for efficient resonance stabilization. 9-Fluorenylidene has been shown to be a rapidly equilibrating mixture of singlet and triplet states with an approximately 1.1 kcal/mol (4.6 kJ/mol) energy difference, although extensive electron delocalization into the rings complicates any conclusions drawn from diaryl carbenes. Simulations suggest that electropositive heteroatoms can thermodynamically stabilize triplet carbenes, such as in silyl and silyloxy carbenes, especially trifluorosilyl carbenes.

Lewis-basic nitrogen, oxygen, sulphur, or halide substituents bonded to the divalent carbon can delocalize an electron pair into an empty p orbital to stabilize the singlet state. This phenomenon, in the context of two nitrogen substituents in a cyclic system, underlies persistent carbenes' remarkable stability. As π-electron pair donors, aryl groups do the same thing, but to a weaker extent, leading to a narrow singlet-triplet gap, especially for electron-donating substituents. Phenylcarbene and other simple arylcarbenes are still ground state triplets. However, aryl(carbomethoxy)carbenes can be ground state triplets or singlets depending on substitution, with electron-donating substituents favoring the singlet ground state.

== Reactivity ==
At a very high level of generality, carbenes behave like aggressive Lewis acids. They can attack lone pairs, but their primary synthetic utility arises from attacks on π bonds, which give cyclopropanes; and on σ bonds, which cause carbene insertion. Other reactions include rearrangements and dimerizations. A particular carbene's reactivity depends on the substituents, including any metals present.

=== Singlet-triplet effects ===
Carbene addition to alkenes

Singlet and triplet carbenes exhibit divergent reactivity.

Triplet carbenes are diradicals, and participate in stepwise radical additions. Triplet carbene addition necessarily involves (at least one) intermediate with two unpaired electrons.

Singlet carbenes can (and do) react as electrophiles, nucleophiles, or ambiphiles. Their reactions are typically concerted and often cheletropic. Singlet carbenes are typically electrophilic, unless they have a filled p orbital, in which case they can react as Lewis bases. The Bamford–Stevens reaction gives carbenes in aprotic solvents and carbenium ions in protic ones.

The different mechanisms imply that singlet carbene additions are stereospecific but triplet carbene additions stereoselective. Methylene from diazomethane photolysis reacts with either cis- or trans-2-butene to give a single diastereomer of 1,2-dimethylcyclopropane: cis from cis and trans from trans. Thus methylene is a singlet carbene; if it were triplet, the product would not depend on the starting alkene geometry.

=== Cyclopropanation ===
Carbene cyclopropanation

Carbenes add to double bonds to form cyclopropanes, and, in the presence of a copper catalyst, to alkynes to give cyclopropenes. Addition reactions are commonly very fast and exothermic, and carbene generation limits reaction rate.

In Simmons-Smith cyclopropanation, the iodomethylzinc iodide typically complexes to any allylic hydroxy groups such that addition is syn to the hydroxy group.

=== C—H insertion ===
Carbene insertion

Insertions are another common type of carbene reaction, a form of oxidative addition. Insertions may or may not occur in single step (see above). The end result is that the carbene interposes itself into an existing bond, preferably X–H (X not carbon), else C–H or (failing that) a C–C bond. Alkyl carbenes insert much more selectively than methylene, which does not differentiate between primary, secondary, and tertiary C-H bonds.

Carbene intramolecular reaction

Carbene intermolecular reaction

The 1,2-rearrangement produced from intramolecular insertion into a bond adjacent to the carbene center is a nuisance in some reaction schemes, as it consumes the carbene to yield the same effect as a traditional elimination reaction. Generally, rigid structures favor intramolecular insertions. In flexible structures, five-membered ring formation is preferred to six-membered ring formation. When such insertions are possible, no intermolecular insertions are seen. Both inter- and intra-molecular insertions admit asymmetric induction from a chiral metal catalyst.

=== Electrophilic attack ===
Carbenes can form adducts with nucleophiles, and are a common precursor to various 1,3-dipoles.

=== Carbene dimerization ===
Wanzlick equilibrium

Carbenes and carbenoid precursors can dimerize to alkenes. This is often, but not always, an unwanted side reaction; metal carbene dimerization has been used in the synthesis of polyalkynylethenes and is the major industrial route to Teflon (see Carbene § Industrial applications). Persistent carbenes equilibrate with their respective dimers, the Wanzlick equilibrium.

== Ligands in organometallic chemistry ==
In organometallic species, metal complexes with the formulae L_{n}MCRR' are often described as carbene complexes. Such species do not however react like free carbenes and are rarely generated from carbene precursors, except for the persistent carbenes. The transition metal carbene complexes can be classified according to their reactivity, with the first two classes being the most clearly defined:

- Fischer carbenes, in which the carbene is bonded to a metal that bears an electron-withdrawing group (usually a carbonyl). In such cases the carbenoid carbon is mildly electrophilic.
- Schrock carbenes, in which the carbene is bonded to a metal that bears an electron-donating group. In such cases the carbenoid carbon is nucleophilic and resembles a Wittig reagent (which are not considered carbene derivatives).
- Carbene radicals, in which the carbene is bonded to an open-shell metal with the carbene carbon possessing a radical character. Carbene radicals have features of both Fischer and Schrock carbenes, but are typically long-lived reaction intermediates.
- The "second generation" of the Grubbs catalysts for alkene metathesis features an NHC ligand.
  N-Heterocyclic (NHC), Arduengo or Wanzlick carbenes are C-deprotonated imidazolium or dihydroimidazolium salts. They often are deployed as ancillary ligands in organometallic chemistry. Such carbenes are usually very strong σ-donor spectator ligands, similar to phosphines.

== Industrial applications ==
A large-scale application of carbenes is the industrial production of tetrafluoroethylene, the precursor to Teflon. Tetrafluoroethylene is generated via the intermediacy of difluorocarbene:

CHClF_{2} → CF_{2} + HCl
2 CF_{2} → F_{2}C=CF_{2}

The insertion of carbenes into C–H bonds has been exploited widely, e.g. the functionalization of polymeric materials and electro-curing of adhesives. Many applications rely on synthetic 3-aryl-3-trifluoromethyldiazirines (a carbene precursor that can be activated by heat, light, or voltage) but there is a whole family of carbene dyes.

== History ==
Carbenes had first been postulated by Eduard Buchner in 1903 in cyclopropanation studies of ethyl diazoacetate with toluene. In 1912 Hermann Staudinger also converted alkenes to cyclopropanes with diazomethane and CH_{2} as an intermediate. According to chemistry folklore, the term 'carbene' was coined by Doering, Winstein, and Woodward during a famous nocturnal cab ride on the occasion of a conference in Chicago in 1951. Doering in 1954 demonstrated their synthetic utility with dichlorocarbene.

== See also ==
- Transition metal carbene complexes
- Atomic carbon a single carbon atom with the chemical formula :C:, in effect a twofold carbene. Also has been used to make "true carbenes" in situ.
- Foiled carbenes derive their stability from proximity of a double bond (i.e. their ability to form conjugated systems).
- Carbene analogs and carbenoids
- Carbenium ions, protonated carbenes
- Ring opening metathesis polymerization
