= C3H3 =

The molecular formula C_{3}H_{3} (molar mass: 39.06 g/mol, exact mass: 39.0235 u) may refer to:

- Cyclopropenium
- Propargyl
