= Aminolysis =

Breakdown of a molecule via reaction with ammonia or an amine

In chemistry, aminolysis (/am·i·nol·y·sis/) is any chemical reaction in which a molecule is lysed (split into two parts) by reacting with ammonia (NH_{3}) or an amine. The case where the reaction involves ammonia may be more specifically referred to as ammonolysis.

== Reaction ==
=== Alkyl group ===
An example of an aminolysis reaction is the replacement of a halogen in an alkyl group (R−X) by an amine (R'−NH_{2}) and the elimination of hydrogen halide (HX).

R−X + R'−NH_{2} → R−NH−R' + HX

=== Synthesis of peptides ===
Another common example is the reaction of a primary amine or secondary amine with a carboxylic acid or with a carboxylic acid derivative to form an amide. This reaction is widely used, especially in the synthesis of peptides. On the simple addition of an amine to a carboxylic acid, a salt of the organic acid and base is obtained. To overcome this, the carboxylic acid first needs to be "activated". This is usually done by converting the acid into a more reactive derivative (i.e. anhydride, acid halide) or by using a coupling agent. In some cases, high temperatures (>200 °C) can overcome salt formation by driving off water, without the need for "activation" of the carboxyl group. The downside to this simple reaction is that the compounds may decompose at these elevated temperatures.

The carboxylic acid derivatives can be esters, anhydrides, acid halides or any other activated species.

The choice of activated carboxyl group or coupling agent can be very important in peptide synthesis, as using the wrong one can lead to racemization.

=== Synthesis of amides from carboxylic acids ===
Making an amide is one of the processes which require ammonia as a reactant. There are other processes of preparing an amide such as from acid anhydrides and acyl chloride.

Carboxylic acids react with ammonium carbonate, to convert the carboxylic acids to ammonium salts. For example, acetic acid reacts with ammonium carbonate to produce ammonium acetate.

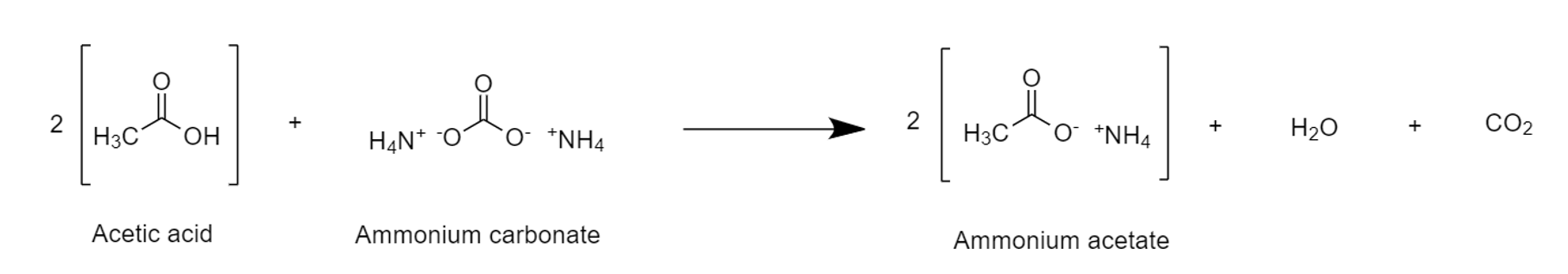

After the reaction is completed, ammonium acetate is heated under reflux (170 °C) to dehydrate the salt and eliminate excess acetic acid and water producing acetamide:

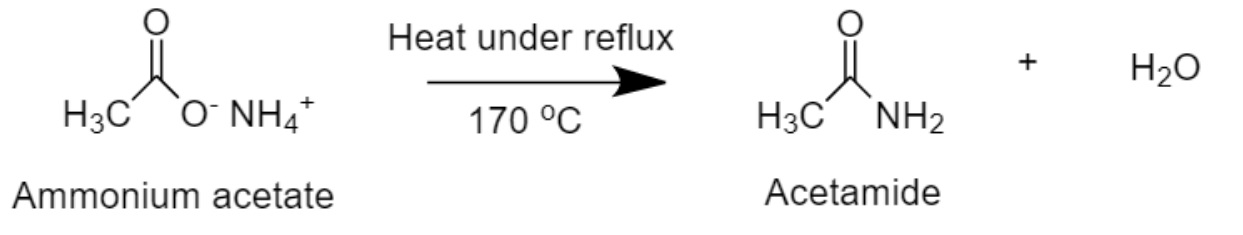

== Usage ==
=== PET degradation ===
PET (Polyethylene terephthalate) belongs to the polyester family, it can be used for many purposes such as plastic bottles and filter cloth as it is thermoplastic polymer. PET can be degraded by using aminolysis which works similarly to solvolytic reaction and aminoglycolysis. For aminolysis, PET reacts with DETA (diethylenetriamine) or TETA (triethylenetetramine) which is polyamine. The reaction involves 200 - 210 Celsius. From this reaction, the products are symmetrical primary amides, asymmetrical primary/ secondary diamides, and symmetrical secondary diamides. The remaining waste material products can be used for hardening of epoxy resins. Similarly, in solvolytic reaction, the polyester reacts with water, acid, amine or alcohol, and in aminoglycolysis reaction, the polyester reacts with TEA (triethanolamine).

This is PET degradation with polyamines through aminolysis route.

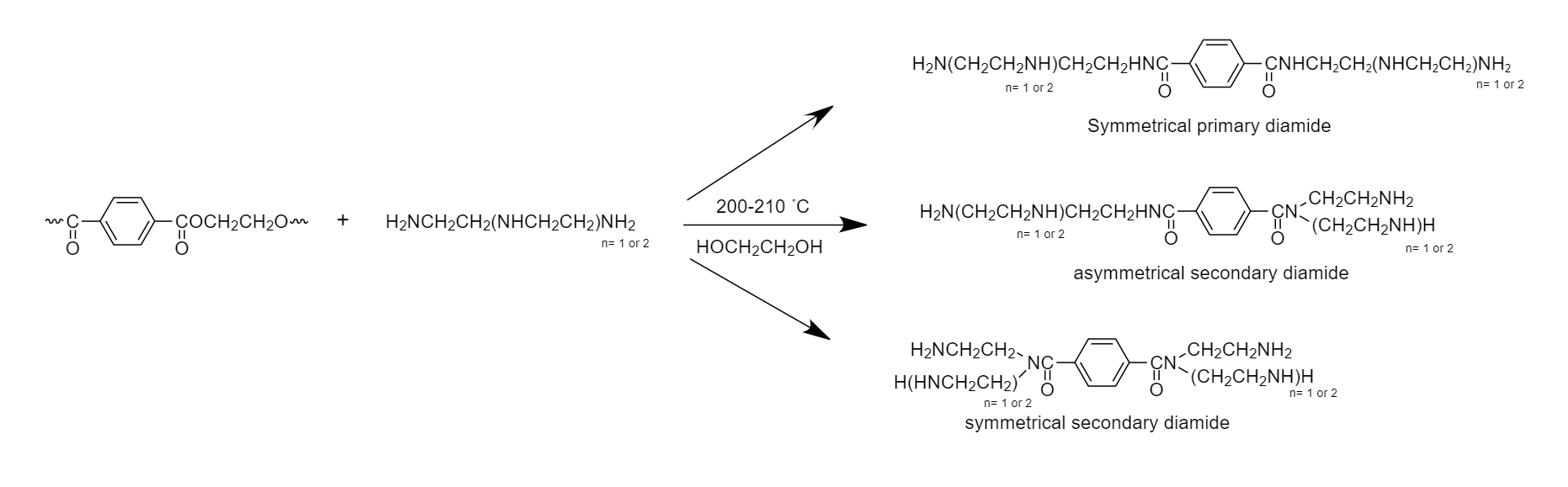

== See also ==
- Solvolysis
