= Tetrachlorocyclopropene =

Identifiers
CAS Number	6262-42-6
3D model (JSmol)	Interactive image
ChemSpider	72642
ECHA InfoCard	100.025.835
PubChem CID	80428
UNII	4161QF853X
CompTox Dashboard (EPA)	DTXSID6021660
- InChI: InChI=1S/C3Cl4/c4-1-2(5)3(1,6)7 Key: BLZOHTXDDOAASQ-UHFFFAOYSA-N
- SMILES: ClC1=C(Cl)C1(Cl)Cl

Properties
Chemical formula	C_{3}Cl_{4}
Molar mass	177.83 g·mol^{−1}
Appearance	Colorless liquid
Density	1.45 g/mL
Boiling point	125–130 °C (257–266 °F; 398–403 K)

Related compounds
Related tetrahalocyclopropenes	Tetrafluorocyclopropene; Tetrabromocyclopropene; Tetraiodocyclopropene
- Except where otherwise noted, data are given for materials in their standard state (at 25 °C [77 °F], 100 kPa). Infobox references

Tetrachlorocyclopropene is a chemical compound with the formula C_{3}Cl_{4}. A colorless liquid, the compound is a reagent used to prepare acetylene derivatives and in organic synthesis. It was first reported by Tobey and West. It is prepared by addition of dichlorocarbene to trichloroethylene and then further treating the resultant pentachlorocyclopropane with base to perform dehydrochlorination.

Treatment with a good chloride-accepting Lewis acid affords trichlorocyclopropenium (C_{3}Cl^{+}_{3}) salts, a carbocation that is aromatic like other cyclopropenium ions, as predicted by Hückel's rule. Aluminum trichloride is most commonly used as the Lewis acid, giving the tetrachloroaluminate salt:

C_{3}Cl_{4} + AlC_{3} → [C_{3}Cl^{+}_{3}][AlCl^{−}_{4}]

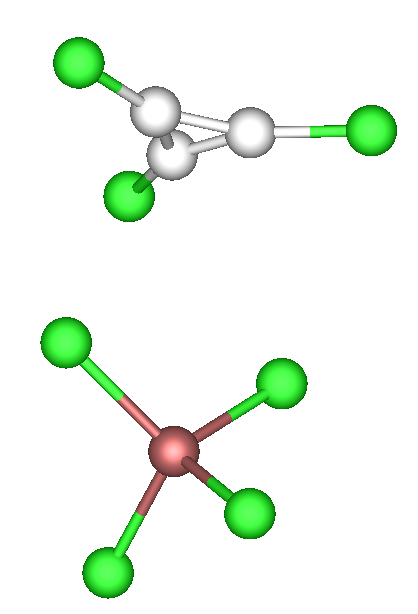
structure of trichlorocyclopropenium tetrachloroaluminate.

The structure of trichlorocyclopropenium has been confirmed by X-ray crystallography of this salt. Salts of hexachloroantimonate (SbCl^{−}_{6}), tetrachloroferrate (FeCl^{−}_{4}), and tetrachlorogallate (GaCl^{−}_{4}) have also been prepared from other Lewis acids. Tetrachlorocyclopropene appears inert towards boron trifluoride and trichloride, but reacts with boron tribromide to give tetrabromocyclopropene, with gaseous boron trichloride leaving solution:

3 C_{3}Cl_{4} + 4 BBr_{3} → 3 C_{3}Br_{4} + 4 BCl_{3}

Arylpropiolate esters may be prepared from trichlorocyclopropenium by reacting with arenes, followed by hydrolysis in alcohols. This can be done without isolating the trichlorocyclopropenium ion.

Trichlorocyclopropene is also used to prepare arylcyclopropanones by a two-step, one-pot procedure beginning with a Friedel-Crafts-like arylation, with trichlorocyclopropenium as an intermediate prepared in situ:

C_{3}Cl_{4} + ArH → ArC_{3}Cl_{3} + HCl (ArH = arene)

The aryltetrachlorocyclopropenes are then hydrolyzed to give the keto-alcohol:

ArC_{3}Cl_{3} + 2 H_{2}O → ArC_{3}O(OH) + 3 HCl
