= Molybdenum nitride =

Chemical compound

Identifiers
CAS Number	12033-31-7
3D model (JSmol)	Interactive image
- InChI: InChI=1S/2Mo.N Key: CXDXWLBOICIIHQ-UHFFFAOYSA-N
- SMILES: [Mo].[Mo].[N]

Properties
Chemical formula	Mo_{2}N
Molar mass	205.91 g·mol^{−1}
Appearance	Gray solid
Density	9.06 g/cm^{3}
- Except where otherwise noted, data are given for materials in their standard state (at 25 °C [77 °F], 100 kPa). Infobox references

Molybdenum nitride (Mo_{2}N) is a binary inorganic compound composed of molybdenum and nitrogen. It belongs to the family of transition metal nitrides and exhibits properties that make it useful in applications such as a catalyst and a coating material.

== Properties ==
Mo_{2}N typically exists in multiple crystalline forms, including hexagonal (hcp) and cubic (fcc) structures. Its properties can vary depending on factors such as synthesis method, stoichiometry, and crystal structure. General properties of molybdenum nitride include:

- High melting point
- Good thermal stability
- High electrical conductivity
- Catalysis in various chemical reactions, including ammonia synthesis and hydrodeoxygenation reactions
- Mechanical hardness and wear resistance, making it suitable for coating applications

== Synthesis ==
Molybdenum nitride can be synthesized through various methods, including:

- Direct nitridation: Molybdenum metal can react with nitrogen gas at elevated temperatures to form Mo_{2}N.
- Ammonolysis: Molybdenum precursors, such as molybdenum oxides or molybdates, can be treated with ammonia gas or ammonia-containing solutions to produce molybdenum nitride.
- Chemical vapor deposition: Molybdenum nitride thin films and coatings can be deposited onto substrates using CVD techniques, such as thermal CVD or plasma-enhanced CVD.

== Applications ==
Molybdenum nitride is utilized as a catalyst in various industrial processes, including ammonia synthesis. Molybdenum nitride exhibits catalytic activity in the Haber-Bosch process for ammonia synthesis, where it serves as an alternative to conventional iron-based catalysts.
