= Alpha elimination =

Type of chemistry reaction

In chemistry, alpha elimination refers to particular types of elimination reactions. The definition of alpha elimination differs for organic chemistry and organometallic chemistry contexts. The symbol alpha, being the first Greek letter, refers to the first atom in the structure attached to some reference atom.

== Organic chemistry ==
In organic chemistry, an alpha-elimination is one in which a hydrogen atom and a leaving group are lost from the same central atom—the alpha carbon—leaving a non-bonded lone pair of electrons. For a central carbon atom, that means the reaction is generically:

R_{2}CHX → R_{2}C: + HX

to generate carbenes. A specific example of this type is the formation of dichlorocarbene from chloroform:

CHCl_{3} → Cl_{2}C: + HCl

Analogous reactions from a nitrogen reactive center give nitrenes.

Alpha eliminations contrasts with beta eliminations—beta is the second atom in the chain—which are commonly used to generate alkenes using the H on the carbon adjacet to the one with the leaving group:

R_{2}CHCXR'_{2} → R_{2}C=CR'_{2} + HX

Both alpha- and beta-eliminations often require a strong base as an additional reactant to drive the reaction, in which case the base initiates the process by attacking the alpha or beta H.

== Organometallic chemistry ==
In organometallic chemistry, alpha elimination refers to reactions of this type (other spectator ligands omitted):

X-M-CH_{2}R → M=CHR + HX

Well studied case are found in organotantalum chemistry leading to an alkylidene derivatives. Specifically, tetraalkyl-monochloro-tantalum complex undergoes α-hydrogen elimination, followed by alkylation of the remaining chloride to give a derivative with a Ta=C bond.

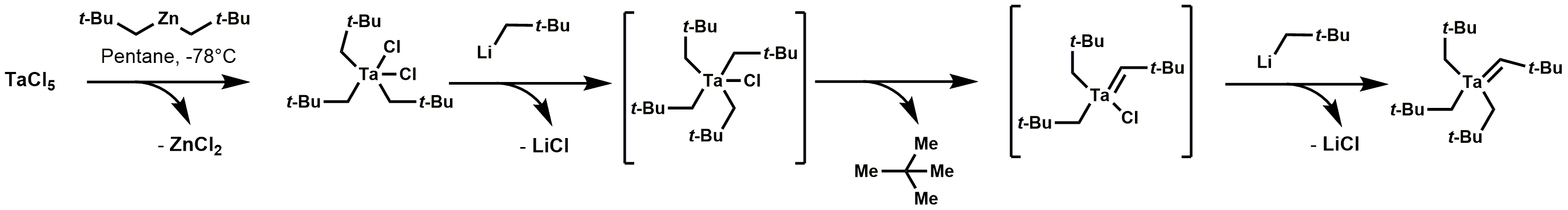
Synthesis of Tantalum Monoalkylidene Complexes

Alpha elimination contrasts with β-hydride elimination, whereby an alkyl group bonded to a metal centre is converted into the corresponding metal-bonded hydride and an alkene.

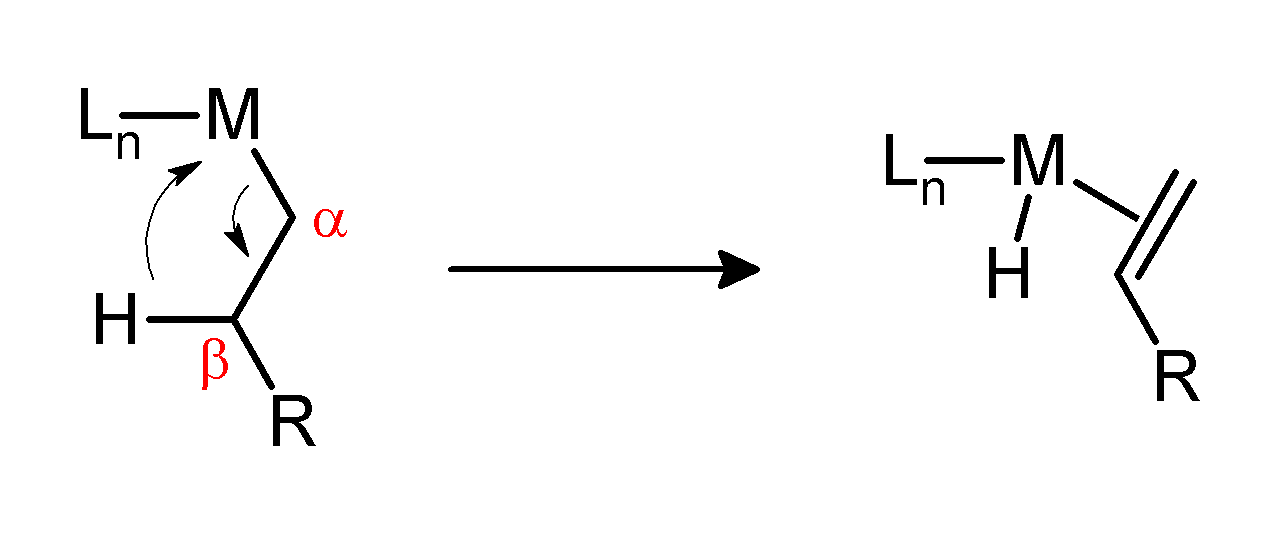

Both α- and β-eliminations proceed via agostic intermediates.
