= Skattebøl rearrangement =

Organic reaction

The Skattebøl rearrangement is an organic reaction for converting a geminal dihalo cyclopropane to an allene using an organolithium base. This rearrangement reaction is named after its discoverer, Lars Skattebøl, Professor emeritus at the University of Oslo. It proceeds through a carbene reaction intermediate:

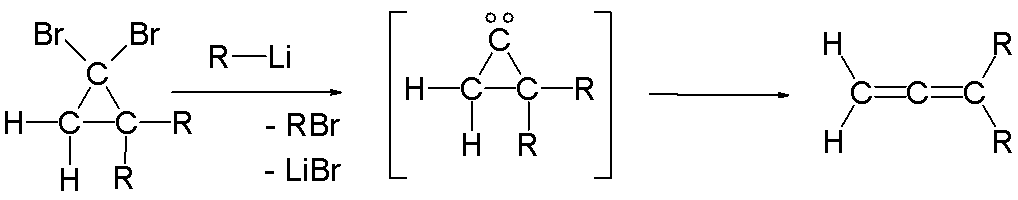
Skattebøl rearrangement

When the cyclopropane ring is fitted with a 2-vinyl group, a cyclopentadiene is formed through a so-called foiled carbene intermediate. This process is more generally known as a vinylcyclopropane rearrangement.

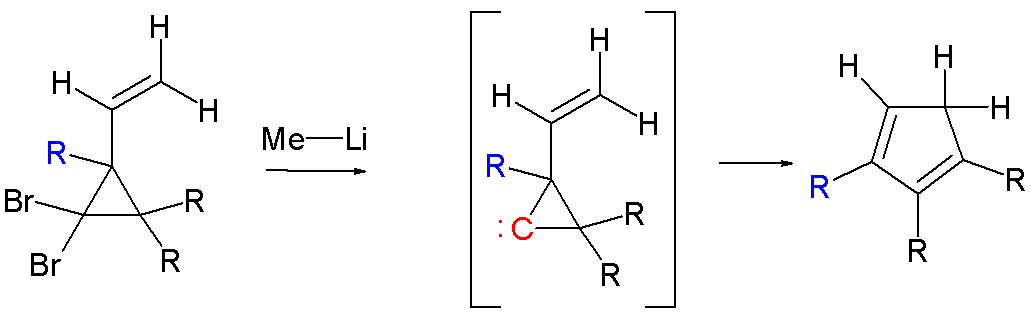
Skattebøl rearrangement

The reaction is closely related to the earlier Doering-LaFlamme procedure (Doering–LaFlamme allene synthesis), in which a gem-dibromocyclopropane is treated with an alkali metal to form the same cyclopropylidene intermediate.
