= Neighbouring group participation =

Interaction of an organic molecule's reaction center with unconjugated electrons

In organic chemistry, neighbouring group participation (NGP, also known as anchimeric assistance) has been defined by the International Union of Pure and Applied Chemistry (IUPAC) as the interaction of a reaction centre with a lone pair of electrons in an atom or the electrons present in a sigma or pi bond contained within the parent molecule but not conjugated with the reaction centre. When NGP is in operation it is normal for the reaction rate to be increased. It is also possible for the stereochemistry of the reaction to be abnormal (or unexpected) when compared with a normal reaction. While it is possible for neighbouring groups to influence many reactions in organic chemistry (e.g. the reaction of a diene such as 1,3-cyclohexadiene with maleic anhydride normally gives the endo isomer because of a secondary effect {overlap of the carbonyl group π orbitals with the transition state in the Diels-Alder reaction}) this page is limited to neighbouring group effects seen with carbocations and S_{N}2 reactions.

== NGP by heteroatom lone pairs ==
In this type of substitution reaction, one group of the substrate participates initially in the reaction and thereby affects the reaction. A classic example of NGP is the reaction of a sulfur or nitrogen mustard with a nucleophile, the rate of reaction is much higher for the sulfur mustard and a nucleophile than it would be for a primary or secondary alkyl chloride without a heteroatom.

Ph−S−CH_{2}−CH_{2}−Cl reacts with water 600 times faster than CH_{3}−CH_{2}−CH_{2}−Cl.

== NGP by an alkene ==
The π orbitals of an alkene can stabilize a transition state by helping to delocalize the positive charge of the carbocation. For instance the unsaturated tosylate will react more quickly (10^{11} times faster for aqueous solvolysis) with a nucleophile than the saturated tosylate.

The carbocationic intermediate will be stabilized by resonance where the positive charge is spread over several atoms. In the diagram below this is shown.

Here is a different view of the same intermediates.

Even if the alkene is more remote from the reacting center the alkene can still act in this way. For instance in the following alkyl benzenesulfonate the alkene is able to delocalise the carbocation.

== NGP by a cyclopropane, cyclobutane or a homoallyl group ==
The reaction of cyclopropylmethamine with sodium nitrite in dilute aqueous perchloric acid solution yielded a mixture of 48% cyclopropylmethyl alcohol, 47% cyclobutanol, and 5% homoallylic alcohol (but-3-en-1-ol). In the non-classical perspective, the positive charge is delocalized throughout the carbocation intermediate structure via resonance, resulting in partial (electron-deficient) bonds. Evidently, the relatively low yield of the homoallylic alcohol implies that the homoallylic structure is the weakest resonance contributor.

== NGP by an aromatic ring ==
An aromatic ring can assist in the formation of a carbocationic intermediate called a phenonium ion by delocalising the positive charge.

When the following tosylate reacts with acetic acid in solvolysis then rather than a simple S_{N}2 reaction forming B, a 48:48:4 mixture of A, B (which are enantiomers) and C+D was obtained.

The mechanism which forms A and B is shown below.

== NGP by aliphatic C-C or C-H bonds ==
Aliphatic C-C or C-H bonds can lead to charge delocalization if these bonds are close and antiperiplanar to the leaving group. Corresponding intermediates are referred to a nonclassical ions, with the 2-norbornyl system as the most well known case.
