= Foiled carbene =

Special type of stabilized carbene

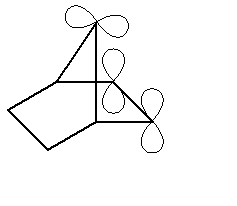
Foiled carbene

A foiled carbene in organic chemistry is a special type of stabilized carbene due to the proximity of a double bond. This type of reactive intermediate is implicated in certain organic reactions. The positive interaction between carbene and double bond is only present in the singlet type and based on through-space electron transfer between the empty carbene p-orbital (LUMO) and filled alkene double bond p-orbitals (HOMO). The result is a three-center two-electron bond akin to certain non-classical ions.

The increased stabilization blocks certain otherwise ordinary reaction modes for the carbene, hence the term foiled. An example is norbornen-7-ylidene, which is norbornene with a carbenic carbon atom at the bridge position. In silico experiments reveal that the bridge in this molecule is actually bending towards the double bond with an optimum angle of around 90° vs 130° for norbornene.
