= Phosphirenium ion =

Series of chemical compounds

Structural formula of a phosphirenium ion. R_{1}, R_{2}, Y_{1}, Y_{2} can be different substitution groups.

Phosphirenium ions (R_{1}R_{2}C_{2}PY_{1}Y^{+}_{2}) are a series of organophosphorus compounds containing unsaturated three-membered ring phosphorus (V) heterocycles and σ*-aromaticity is believed to be present in such molecules. Many of the salts containing phosphirenium ions have been isolated and characterized by NMR spectroscopy and X-ray crystallography.

== Synthesis ==
The first series of phosphirenium ions were synthesized by reacting alkynes with methyl- or phenylphosphonous dichloride and aluminum trichloride. These reactions may be regarded as formal addition of "RClP^{+}" to alkynes.

[2+1]-cycloaddition reactions between phosphaalkynes and chlorocarbene give phosphirenes, which serve as starting materials for the generation of phosphirenium species.

Treatment of diphenylphosphine oxide with diphenylacetylene affords phosphirenium species.

Phosphirenium ions can also be obtained from reaction between phosphiranes and alkynes, where "RClP^{+}" is formally transferred from alkenes to alkynes.

== Characterizations ==
In the literature, ^{31}P NMR spectra of phosphirenium ions show upfield shifts (−57.3 ppm when R_{1} = R_{2} = Y_{1} = CH_{3}, Y_{2} = Cl). Large coupling constants J are also found in ^{1}H NMR, and are comparable to those found in cyclopropenium ions.

The first phosphirenium ion characterized by X-ray Crystallography has the following structural formula:

In the refined crystal structure, average phosphorus–cyclic carbon distance has been found to be 1.731(12) Å, roughly corresponding to a bond order of 1.5. For comparison, typical single- and double-bond P–C distances are 1.86 Å and 1.68 Å, respectively.

== Reactivity ==
Reminiscent of π-ligand exchange in coordination compounds, a phosphirenium ion may undergo alkyne exchange with other alkynes to give a mixture of phospinirenium species in equilibrium. Kinetically, elimination of alkyne from the cation is suggested to be rate-determining step.

In addition, the three-membered ring of phosphirenium ion may be broken. Successive reactions with suitable nucleophile are able to proceed on the electrophilic phosphorus atom. With the presence of an alkyne:

With the presence of water or alcohol:

Electrophilic B(C_{6}F_{5})_{3} readily reacts with phosphinylalkynes at room temperature to give phosphirenium-borate zwitterions as intermediates, which then generate carbon-phosphorus σ bond activation products at higher temperature. The products are of interest to material science. Dotted line in product indicates weak interaction between boron and phosphor atoms (see frustrated Lewis pair).

== σ*-Aromaticity ==
Qualitative molecular orbital (MO) diagram of a phophirenium ion can be obtained by linear combination of orbitals from a PY^{+}_{2} fragment and a bent RC=CR fragment. A low-lying σ* orbital from the former with ungerade symmetry interacts with both π and π* orbitals of the latter, creating a 2π-Hückel system, analogous to the one in cyclopropenium ion. This effect has been named as σ*-aromaticity. It is noteworthy that unlike the case of cyclopropenium ion, interaction between the filled σ orbital of the PY^{+}_{2} fragment and π orbitals also leads to some degree of antiaromatic character. Therefore, net 3-center conjugative effect is a combination of both σ* stabilizing contribution and σ destabilizing contribution.

Electronegativity of each substituent on phosphorus plays a role as more electron-donating ones give greater degrees of antiaromatic sigma destabilization. This has been confirmed by Natural Population Analysis (NPA), where the energy changes of the reactions below were calculated with interactions between the C–C double bond and phosphorus both turned on and off by manipulating Fock matrix elements:

Major Lewis structures of H_{2}C_{2}PF^{+}_{2} from NBO analysis.

Destabilization energies were the differences between corresponding reactions:

- Destabilization energy = energy (1) − energy (2)
- Destabilization Energy with different Y groups: Y = F > OH > Cl > NH_{2} > Br > I > CH_{3} > H

This series is in accordance with the trend of electronegativity of the ligand atoms.

Natural bond orbital (NBO) analysis provides possible Lewis structures of a molecule and has been carried out to assess the structure of H_{2}C_{2}PF^{+}_{2}. Similar to the aromatic cyclopropenium ion, the phosphorus analog shows a resonance between the structure with carbon-carbon double bond (1, 72.02%) and the ones with carbon-phosphorus double bond (3a and 3b, 7.88% combined). In addition, the ring-opening forms 2a and 2b combined also occupy 9.08% weight.
