= Tetrachloroaluminate =

Ion

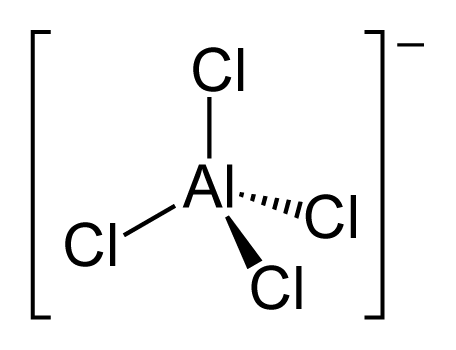

Names
- IUPAC name Tetrachloroaluminate(1–)
- Systematic IUPAC name Tetrachloroaluminate(1−)
- Other names: Aluminate(1−), tetrachloro; tetrachloridoaluminate(1−); tetrachloridoaluminate(1−); tetrachloroalumanuide

Identifiers
CAS Number	17611-22-2
3D model (JSmol)	Interactive image
ChEBI	CHEBI:30110
ChemSpider	10737456
Gmelin Reference	2297
PubChem CID	3728926
CompTox Dashboard (EPA)	DTXSID301336609
- InChI: InChI=1S/Al.4ClH/h;4*1H/q+3;;;;/p-4 Key: BXILREUWHCQFES-UHFFFAOYSA-J; InChI=1S/Al.4ClH/h;4*1H/q+3;;;;/p-4 Key: BXILREUWHCQFES-UHFFFAOYSA-J
- SMILES: Cl[Al-](Cl)(Cl)Cl

Properties
Chemical formula	AlCl^{−}_{4}
Molar mass	168.78 g·mol^{−1}

Structure
Point group	T_{d}
Molecular shape	Tetrahedral
Hybridisation	sp^{3}
- Except where otherwise noted, data are given for materials in their standard state (at 25 °C [77 °F], 100 kPa). verify (what is ?) Infobox references

Tetrachloroaluminate [AlCl_{4}]^{−} is an anion formed from aluminium trichloride and chloride. The anion has a tetrahedral shape and is isoelectronic with silicon tetrachloride. Some tetrachloroaluminates are soluble in organic solvents, creating an ionic non-aqueous solution, making them suitable as component of electrolytes for batteries. For example, lithium tetrachloroaluminate is used in some lithium batteries.

== Formation ==
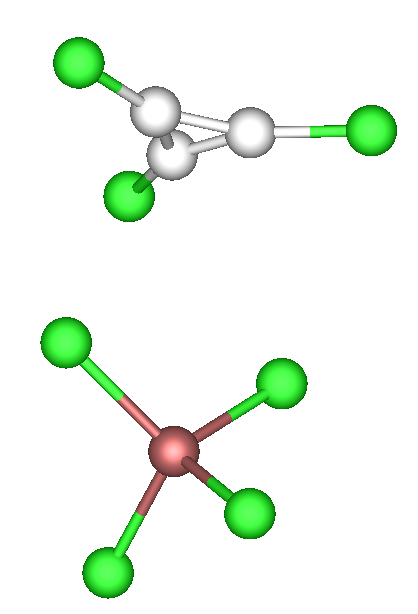
structure of tetrachloroaluminate salt of trichlorocyclopropenium cation. Color code: Cl = green, mauve = Al. The Al−Cl distance is 213 picometers.

Tetrachloroaluminate ions are formed as intermediates in the Friedel–Crafts reactions when aluminium chloride is used as the catalyst. In the case of the Friedel–Crafts acylation, the reaction is often broken into three steps as follows:

1. The acyl halide reacts with the strong Lewis acid to form an activated electrophile, tetrachloroaluminate salt of the acylium ion.
  RC(O)Cl +AlCl_{3} → [RC≡O^{+}][AlCl^{−}_{4}]
2. The aromatic substrate reacts with the acylium cation to give a benzenium carbocation.
  [RC≡O^{+}][AlCl^{−}_{4}] + C_{6}H_{6} → [RC(=O)C_{6}H^{+}_{6}][AlCl^{−}_{4}]
3. The acylbenzenium carbocation releases a proton, generating the acylarene, aluminium trichloride, and hydrogen chloride (not hydrochloric acid).
  [C_{6}H_{6}COR]^{+}AlCl^{−}_{4} → C_{6}H_{5}COR + AlCl_{3} + HCl
