= Reactive dye =

Type of dye

In a reactive dye, a chromophore (an atom or group whose presence is responsible for the colour of a compound) contains a substituent that reacts with the substrate. Reactive dyes have good fastness properties owing to the covalent bonding that occurs during dyeing. Reactive dyeing is the most important method for coloring cellulose fibers. Reactive dyes can also be applied on wool and nylon; in the latter case they are applied under weakly acidic conditions. Reactive dyes have a low utilization degree compared to other types of dyestuff, since the functional group also bonds to water, creating hydrolysis.

== Usage ==
Reactive dyes had been tested in the late 1800s involving both adding functionalized dyes to the substrate and then activating the substrate first followed by fixation of the dye. The first commercial success was described in the early 1950s. Rattee and Stephens at Imperial Chemical Industries (ICI) popularized the chlorotriazines as linkers between the substrate and the chromophore.

Trichlorotriazine remain a popular platform for reactive dyes. The chromophore, with an amine functional group, is attached to the triazine, displacing one chloride:

(NCCl)_{3} + dye-NH_{2} → N_{3}C_{3}Cl_{2}(NHdye) + HCl

The resulting dichlorotriazine can then be affixed to the cellulose fibre by displacement of one of the two chloride groups:

N_{3}C_{3}Cl_{2}(NHdye) + HO-cellulose → N_{3}C_{3}Cl(NHdye)(O-cellulose) + HCl

The fixation process is conducted in a buffered alkaline dye bath.

An alternative fixation process that is more dominant commercially is the vinylsulfonyl group. Like the chlorotriazines, this functional group adds to the hydroxyl groups of cellulose. The most popular version of this technology is Remazol. The dye is first attached to the ethylsulfonyl group.

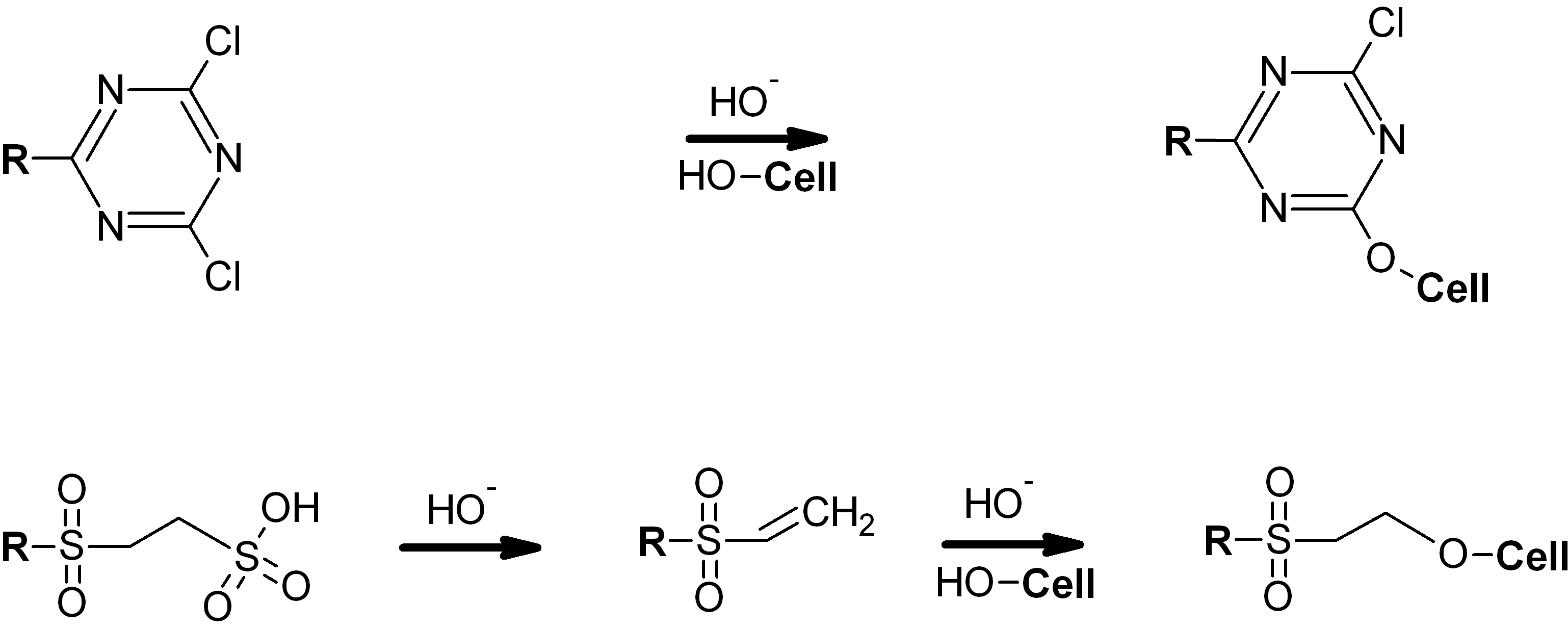
Methods for attaching reactive dyes to fibres (Cell = cellulose; R = chromophore).

Reactive dyes are categorized by functional group.

Functionality	Fixation	Temperature	Included in Brands
Monochlorotriazine	Haloheterocycle	80 °C	Basilen E & P, Cibacron E, Procion H,HE
Monofluorochlorotriazine	Haloheterocycle	40 °C	Cibacron F & C
Dichlorotriazine	Haloheterocycle	30 °C	Basilen M, Procion MX
Difluorochloropyrimidine	Haloheterocycle	40 °C	Levafix EA, Drimarene K & R
Dichloroquinoxaline	Haloheterocycle	40 °C	Levafix E
Trichloropyrimidine	Haloheterocycle	80-98 °C	Drimarene X & Z, Cibacron T
Vinyl sulfone	activated double bond	40˚	Remazol
Vinyl amide	activated double bond	40˚	Remazol

=== Bi- and polyfunctional reactive dyes ===
Dyestuffs with only one functional group sometimes have a low degree of fixation. To overcome this deficiency, dyestuffs containing two (or more) different reactive groups were developed. These dyestuffs containing two groups are also known as bifunctional dyestuffs although some still refer to the original combination. Some contain two monochlorotriazines, others have a combination of the triazines and one vinyl sulfone group). Bifunctional dyes can be more tolerant to temperature deviations (better process). Other bifunctionals have been created, some with fastness (better quality) or only fixation degree (better environment or economy) in mind.

== See also ==
- Carbene dye
- Cationization of cotton for salt-free dyeing
- Dyeing
- Dispersing agent for dyeing
