= Procion =

Fibre reactive dye brand name

Procion is a brand of fibre reactive dyes. They are commonly used in tie dye and other textile crafts. They are dichlorotriazine dyes and were originally made by Imperial Chemical Industries. The brand name is now owned by Dystar, but, since the patent on the dyes has expired, many manufacturers around the world now make them.

== Procion dyes ==
- Procion MX are a class of cold reactive dyes.
- Procion H-E and H-EXL are hot water dyes
- Procion P and SP are designed for textile printing
