= Pentachlorocyclopropane =

Names
- IUPAC name 1,1,2,2,3-Pentachlorocyclopropane

Identifiers
CAS Number	6262-51-7
3D model (JSmol)	Interactive image
ChemSpider	21214
EC Number	613-064-5
PubChem CID	22631
UNII	V4TJ9AL9RF
CompTox Dashboard (EPA)	DTXSID6073366
- InChI: InChI=1S/C3HCl5/c4-1-2(5,6)3(1,7)8/h1H Key: IACJMSLMMMSESC-UHFFFAOYSA-N
- SMILES: C1(C(C1(Cl)Cl)(Cl)Cl)Cl

Properties
Chemical formula	C_{3}HCl_{5}
Molar mass	214.29 g·mol^{−1}
Appearance	Colourless liquid
Odor	Mild, minty
Density	1.668 g/cm^{3}
Boiling point	56 °C / 7 mmHg
Refractive index (n_{D})	1.51
- Except where otherwise noted, data are given for materials in their standard state (at 25 °C [77 °F], 100 kPa). Infobox references

Pentachlorocyclopropane is a chlorinated cyclopropane with the chemical formula C_{3}HCl_{5}. It is a colourless liquid with a faint minty odour. It is thermally unstable above 100 °C; decomposition gives 1,1,3,3,3-pentachloropropene by isomerisation. Pentachlorocyclopropane can be obtained by the addition of dichlorocarbene into trichloroethylene in presence of a base. Pentachlorocyclopropane itself gives tetrachlorocyclopropene when reacted with a base such as potassium hydroxide by means of dehydrohalogenation.
