= Saul Winstein =

Canadian chemist (1912–1969)

- Born: October 8, 1912; Montreal, Quebec, Canada
- Died: November 23, 1969 (aged 57); Los Angeles, California, United States
- Known for: Winstein reaction Grunwald–Winstein equation Non-classical cation Anchimeric assistance
- Awards: ACS Award in Pure Chemistry (1948); National Medal of Science (1970)
- Scientific career
- Fields: Physical Organic Chemistry
- Workplaces: UCLA

Saul Winstein (October 8, 1912 – November 23, 1969) was a Canadian-American chemist who discovered the Winstein reaction. He argued a non-classical cation was needed to explain the stability of the norbornyl cation. This fueled a debate with Herbert C. Brown over the existence of σ-delocalized carbocations. Winstein also first proposed the concept of an intimate ion pair. He was co-author of the Grunwald–Winstein equation, concerning solvolysis rates.

Richard F. Heck, who earlier in his career had undertaken postgraduate studies with Winstein, won the 2010 Nobel Prize in Chemistry.
