= Carbene dye =

Reactive dye based on carbene chemistry

A carbene dye is a reactive dye based on carbene chemistry.

A benzophenone is functionalised with a chromophore or group that can be easily converted to a chromophore at a later stage. The functionalised benzophenone is reacted with hydrazine hydrate and subsequently treatment with mercury oxide. The resulting diazo compound is stable at room temperature. On heating, nitrogen gas is released and the carbene generated. The thus generated carbene reacts rapidly with substrates such as nylon, cotton, glass and polyethylene.

The highly reactive carbene group removes the need for different functional groups depending on the substrate to be dyed. For example, a dye that can colour cotton would usually not be appropriate for dyeing polyethylene, but by using a carbene, the same dye can be used for both.
