= Phenyl(trichloromethyl)mercury =

Identifiers
CAS Number	3294-57-3
3D model (JSmol)	Interactive image
ChemSpider	69255
EC Number	221-960-9
PubChem CID	76799
UNII	JH955G783H
- InChI: InChI=1S/C6H5.CCl3.Hg/c1-2-4-6-5-3-1;2-1(3)4;/h1-5H;; Key: MVIAEGXPYBMVPT-UHFFFAOYSA-N
- SMILES: C1=CC=C(C=C1)[Hg]C(Cl)(Cl)Cl

Properties
Chemical formula	C_{7}H_{5}Cl_{3}Hg
Molar mass	396.06 g·mol^{−1}
Appearance	white solid
Melting point	117–118 °C (243–244 °F; 390–391 K)

Hazards
- Occupational safety and health (OHS/OSH)
Main hazards	toxicity
- GHS labelling
Pictograms	(GHS06: Toxic) (GHS08: Health hazard) (GHS09: Environmental hazard)
Signal word	Danger
Hazard statements	H300, H310, H330, H373, H410
Precautionary statements	P260, P262, P264, P270, P271, P273, P280, P284, P301+P310, P302+P350, P304+P340, P310, P314, P320, P321, P330, P361, P363, P391, P403+P233, P405, P501
- Except where otherwise noted, data are given for materials in their standard state (at 25 °C [77 °F], 100 kPa). Infobox references

Phenyl(trichloromethyl)mercury is an organomercury compound with the formula C_{6}H_{5}HgCCl_{3}. It is a white solid that is soluble in organic solvents. The compound is used as a source of dichlorocarbene, e.g. in cyclopropanation reactions, because the products are particularly easy to extract from the reaction mixture. Strong nucleophiles may catalyze the reaction by displacing CCl^{−}_{3} from mercury, although the free ion is not believed to form in the process. Unusually, the pure organomercury compound reacts with electron-poor alkenes, converting tetrachloroethylene to hexachlorocyclopropane:

C_{6}H_{5}HgCCl_{3} → C_{6}H_{5}HgCl + CCl_{2}
CCl_{2} + Cl_{2}C=CCl_{2} → C_{3}Cl_{6}

The compound is prepared by treating phenylmercuric chloride with sources of dichlorocarbene. These include the base/haloform reaction and thermolysis of sodium trichloroacetate:

NaO_{2}CCCl_{3} + C_{6}H_{5}HgCl → C_{6}H_{5}HgCCl_{3} + NaCl + CO_{2}

== Related compounds ==
Closely related compounds include phenyl(bromodichloromethyl)mercury (CAS registry number 3294-58-4) and phenyl(tribromomethyl)mercury (CAS registry number 3294-60-8). According to X-ray crystallography, the former has nearly linear coordination geometry at mercury, with a C-Hg-C angle of 179° and Hg-C distances of 2.047 Å.

Also known is bis(trichloromethyl)mercury, Hg(CCl_{3})_{2}.
