= Lars Skattebøl =

Norwegian chemist

Lars Skattebøl FRSC (born 16 July 1927) is a Norwegian scientist and professor emeritus at the University of Oslo. The Skattebøl rearrangement, a chemical reaction, was named after his discovery. He was born in Bærum.

Skattebøl received his degree in engineering from Norwegian Institute of Technology in 1951 and a doctorate in chemistry from the University of Manchester in 1956. He has worked as a researcher for Union Carbide in Brussels, at SINTEF in Trondheim as well as Norsk Hydro.

As a scholar, Skattebøl has been employed as professor in chemistry at the Oslo University and the University of Tromsø. He has received a number of awards and is a fellow of several scientific academies in his native country, including the Norwegian Academy of Science and Letters, the Royal Norwegian Society of Sciences and Letters, The Royal Society of Chemistry and the American Chemical Society. He chaired the Norwegian Chemical Society for six years, is now an honorary member there, and was an editorial board member of Acta Chemica Scandinavica.
