= Doering–LaFlamme allene synthesis =

Chemical reaction

The Doering–LaFlamme allene synthesis is a reaction of alkenes that converts them to allenes by insertion of a carbon atom. This name reaction is named for William von Eggers Doering and a co-worker, who first reported it.

The reaction is a two-stage process, in which first the alkene is reacted with dichlorocarbene or dibromocarbene to form a dihalocyclopropane. This intermediate is then reacted with a reducing metal, such as sodium or magnesium, or with an organolithium reagent. Either approach results in metal-halogen exchange to convert the gem-dihalogenated carbon to a 1-metallo-1-halocyclopropane. This species undergoes α-elimination of metal halide and ring-opening via an electrocyclic reaction (at least formally) to give the allene. Several different mechanisms for the electrocyclic rearrangement have been studied.

In a study in which an enantioenriched substituted cyclopropyl Grignard reagent was prepared, the reaction was shown to give the allene with very high levels of enantiospecificity, suggesting a concerted mechanism. Similarly, in a computational study of the bromolithiocyclopropane, a concerted mechanism was found to be favored. A discrete cyclopropylidene carbene was found to be unlikely, although early ejection of LiBr (roughly simultaneous to C–C bond scission and before formation of the orthogonal pi bonds of the allene) was suggested.

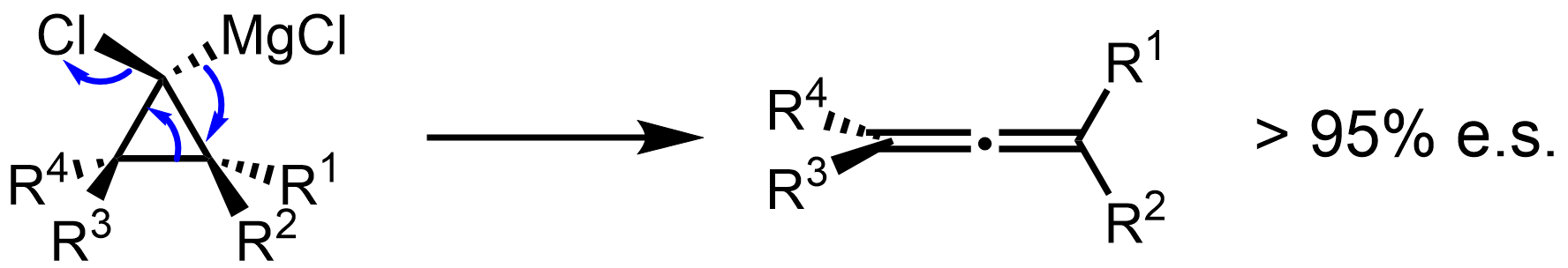
