= Cyclopropenium ion =

Chemical compound

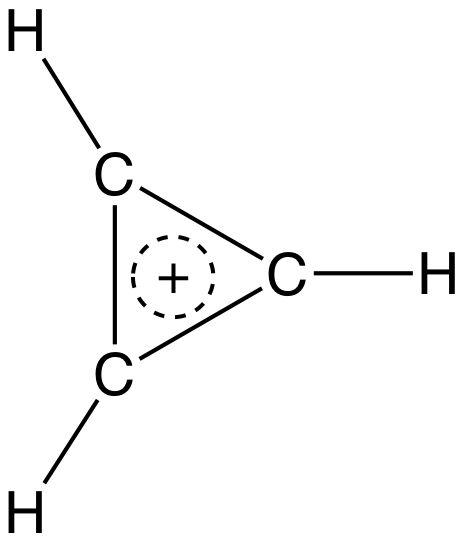
The cyclopropenium cation

The cyclopropenium ion is the cation with the formula C_{3}H^{+}_{3}. It has attracted attention as the smallest example of an aromatic cation. Its salts have been isolated, and many derivatives have been characterized by X-ray crystallography. The cation and some simple derivatives have been identified in the atmosphere of the Saturnian moon Titan.

== Bonding ==
With two π electrons, the cyclopropenium cation class obeys Hückel’s rules of aromaticity for 4n + 2 electrons since, in this case, n = 0. Consistent with this prediction, the C_{3}H_{3} core is planar and the C–C bonds are equivalent. In the case of the cation in [C_{3}(SiMe_{3})_{3}]^{+}SbCl^{−}_{6}, the ring C–C distances range from 1.374(2) to 1.392(2) Å.

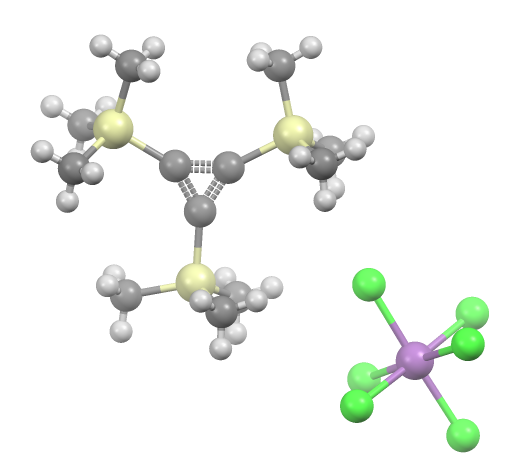
Structure of the salt [C_{3}(SiMe_{3})_{3}]^{+}SbCl^{−}_{6}

== Syntheses ==
Salts of many cyclopropenyl cations have been characterized. Their stability varies according to the steric and inductive effects of the substituents.

Salts of triphenylcyclopropenium were first reported by Ronald Breslow in 1957. The salt was prepared in two steps starting with the reaction of phenyldiazoacetonitrile with diphenylacetylene to yield 1,2,3-triphenyl-3-cyclopropene nitrile. Treatment of this with boron trifluoride yielded [C_{3}Ph_{3}]BF_{4}.

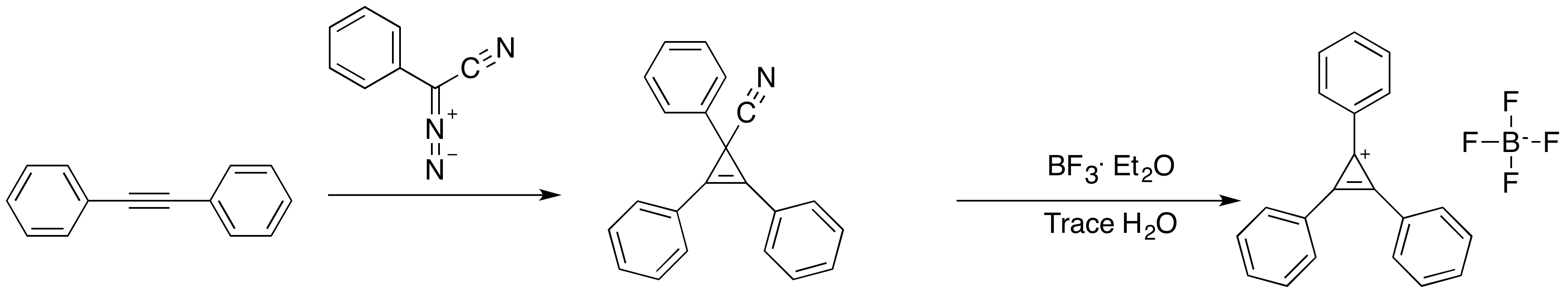

Per a 1970 paper reporting the parent cation's isolation, "Simple mixing of 3-chlorocyclopropene with antimony pentachloride, aluminum trichloride, or silver fluoroborate...[leads] to the salts of cyclopropenyl cation." The hexachloroantimonate (SbCl^{−}_{6}) salt is indefinitely stable at −20 °C.

Trichlorocyclopropenium salts are generated by chloride abstraction from tetrachlorocyclopropene:

C_{3}Cl_{4} + AlCl_{3} → [C_{3}Cl_{3}]^{+}AlCl^{−}_{4}

Tetrachlorocyclopropene can be converted to tris(tert-butyldimethylsilyl)cyclopropene. Hydride abstraction with nitrosonium tetrafluoroborate yields the trisilyl-substituted cyclopropenium cation.

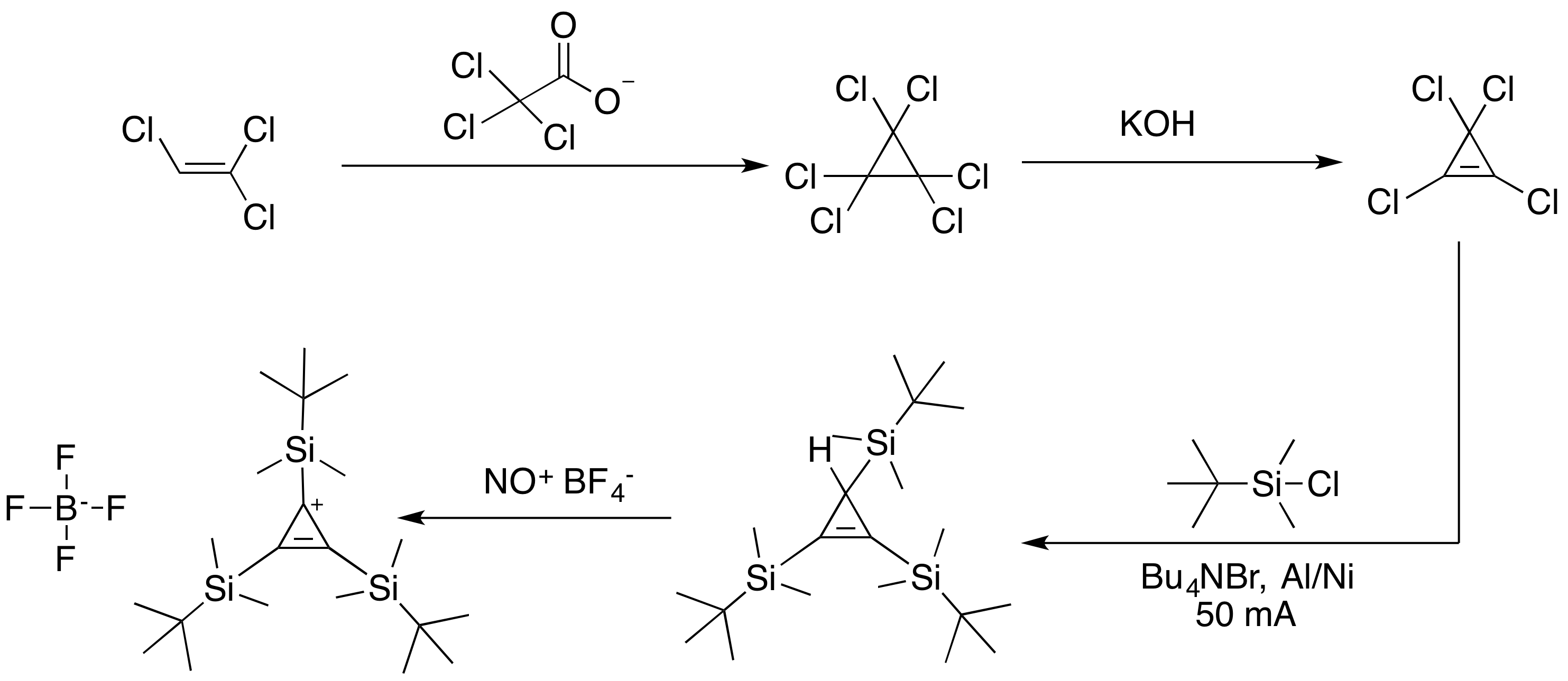

Amino-substituted cyclopropenium salts are particularly stable. Calicene is an unusual derivative featuring cyclopropenium linked to a cyclopentadienide.

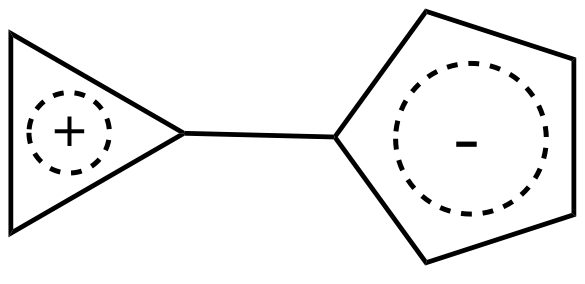
Calicene features a cyclopropenium ring.

== Reactions ==
=== Organic chemistry ===
Chloride salts of cyclopropenium esters are intermediates in the use of dichlorocyclopropenes for the conversion of carboxylic acids to acid chlorides:

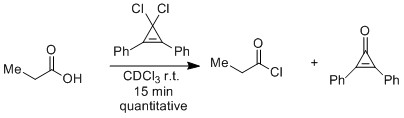

Related cyclopropenium cations are produced in the regeneration of the 1,1-dichlorocyclopropenes from the cyclopropenones.

The cyclopropenium chlorides have been applied to peptide bond formation. For example, in the figure below, reacting a boc-protected amino acid with an unprotected amino acid in the presence of the cyclopropenium ion allows the formation of a peptide bond via acid chloride formation followed by nucleophilic substitution with the unprotected amino acid.

This method of mildly generating acid chlorides can also be useful for linking alpha-anomeric sugars. After using the cyclopropenium ion to form the chloride at the anomeric carbon, the compound is iodinated with tetrabutylammonium iodide. This iodine can thereafter be substituted by any ROH group to quickly undergo alpha-selective linkage of sugars.

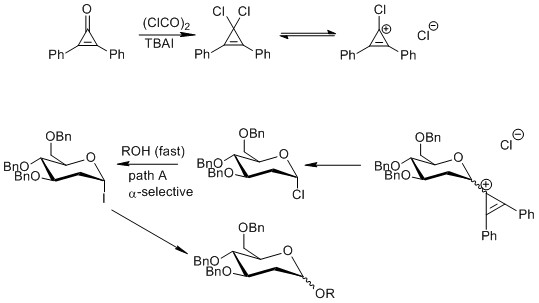

Additionally, some synthetic routes make use of cyclopropenium ring openings yielding an allylcarbene cation. The linear degradation product yields both a nucleophilic and electrophilic carbon centers.

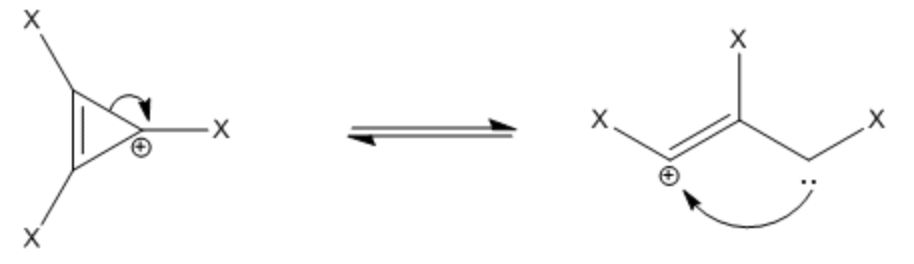

=== Organometallic compounds ===
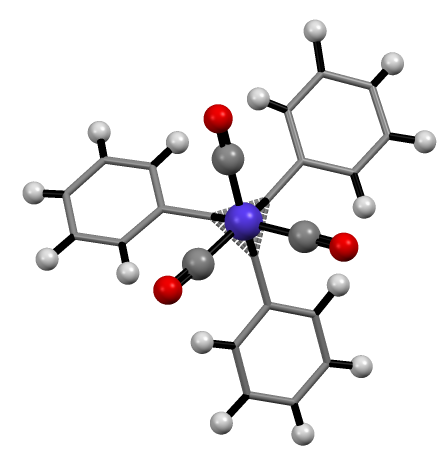
Structure of Ph_{3}C_{3}Co(CO)_{3} viewed down the C_{3} symmetry axis.

Many complexes are known with cyclopropenium ligands. Examples include [M(C_{3}Ph_{3})(PPh_{3})_{2}]^{+} (M = Ni, Pd, Pt) and Co(C_{3}Ph_{3})(CO)_{3}. Such compounds are prepared by reaction of cyclopropenium salts with low valent metal complexes.

== As polyelectrolytes ==
Because many substituted derivatives are known, cyclopropenium salts have attracted attention as possible polyelectrolytes, relevant to technologies such as desalination and fuel cells. The tris(dialkylamino)cyclopropenium salts have been particularly evaluated because of their high stability.

== See also ==
- Phosphirenium ion
