= Solvolysis =

Substitution or elimination reaction where the nucleophile is a solvent

In chemistry, solvolysis is a type of nucleophilic substitution (S_{N}1/S_{N}2) or elimination where the nucleophile is a solvent molecule. Characteristic of S_{N}1 reactions, solvolysis of a chiral reactant affords the racemate. Sometimes however, the stereochemical course is complicated by intimate ion pairs, whereby the leaving anion remains close to the carbocation, effectively shielding it from an attack by the nucleophile. Particularly fast reactions can occur by neighbour group participation, with nonclassical ions as intermediates or transition states.

== Examples ==
For certain nucleophiles, solvolysis reactions are classified. Solvolysis involving water is called hydrolysis. Related terms are alcoholysis (alcohols) and specifically methanolysis (methanol), acetolysis, ammonolysis (ammonia), and aminolysis (alkyl amines). Glycolysis is however an older term for the multistep conversion of glucose to pyruvate.

=== Hydrolysis ===
While solvolysis often refers to an organic chemistry context, hydrolysis is common throughout inorganic chemistry, where aqua complexes of metal ions react with solvent molecules due to the Lewis acidity of the metal center. For example, aqueous solutions of aluminium chloride are acidic due to the aqua-aluminium complex losing protons to water molecules, giving hydronium ions which lowers the pH.

In organic chemistry, hydrolysis reactions often give two fragments from an initial substrate. For example, the hydrolysis of amides give carboxylic acids and amines; the hydrolysis of esters give alcohols and carboxylic acids.

=== Alcoholysis ===
An example of a solvolysis reaction is the reaction of a triglyceride with a simple alcohol such as methanol or ethanol to give the methyl or ethyl esters of the fatty acid, as well as glycerol. This reaction is more commonly known as a transesterification reaction due to the exchange of the alcohol fragments.

=== Ammonolysis ===
Ammonolysis refers to solvolysis by ammonia, but can also describe nucleophilic attack by ammonia more generally. Ammonia boils at −33 °C, and, as such, is rarely used as a solvent in its pure form. It is, however, readily miscible with water, and is commonly used in the form of a saturated aqueous solution. For this reason, ammonolysis may be considered as a special case of solvolysis, as the ammonia is itself dissolved in a solvent. Despite this, the reactions are usually highly selective, due to the greater nucleophilicity of ammonia compared to water.

== See also ==
- Electrolysis
- Pyrolysis
- Nonclassical Ions
- List of water-miscible solvents
