= Dichlorocarbene =

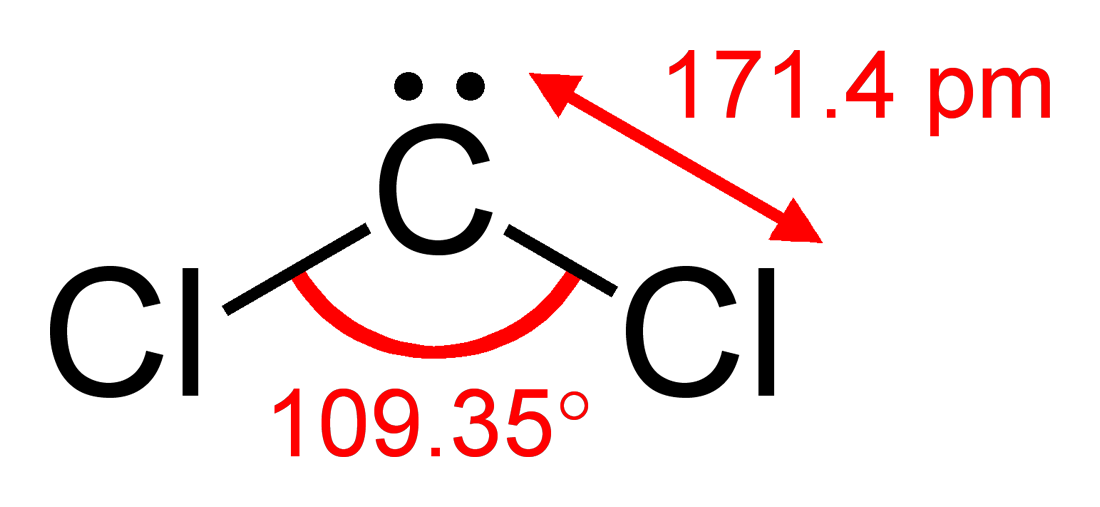
Wireframe model of dichlorocarbene
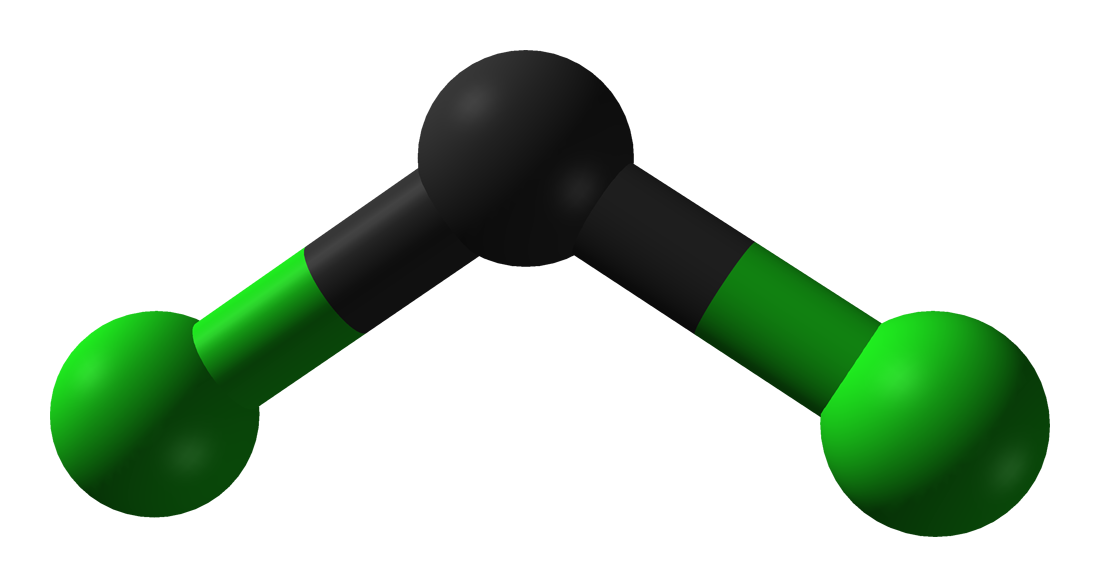
Ball and stick model of dichlorocarbene

Names
- Preferred IUPAC name Dichloromethylidene
- Other names Carbon(II) chloride Carbon dichloride Carbonous chloride Dichloro-λ^{2}-methane Dichloromethylene

Identifiers
CAS Number	1605-72-7
3D model (JSmol)	Interactive image
Beilstein Reference	1616279
ChEBI	CHEBI:51370
ChemSpider	4937404
Gmelin Reference	200357
MeSH	Dichlorocarbene
PubChem CID	6432145
UNII	E73HG1090V
CompTox Dashboard (EPA)	DTXSID60166893
- InChI: InChI=1/CCl2/c2-1-3 Key: PFBUKDPBVNJDEW-UHFFFAOYAT
- SMILES: [C](Cl)Cl

Properties
Chemical formula	CCl_{2}
Molar mass	82.91 g·mol^{−1}

Hazards
- Occupational safety and health (OHS/OSH)
Main hazards	Highly reactive

Related compounds
Related compounds	C_{2}Cl_{4}
- Except where otherwise noted, data are given for materials in their standard state (at 25 °C [77 °F], 100 kPa). Infobox references

Dichlorocarbene is the reactive intermediate with chemical formula CCl_{2}. Although this chemical species has not been isolated, it is a common intermediate in organic chemistry, being generated from chloroform. This bent diamagnetic molecule rapidly inserts into other bonds.

== Preparation ==
Dichlorocarbene is most commonly generated by reaction of chloroform and a base such as potassium tert-butoxide or aqueous sodium hydroxide. A phase transfer catalyst, for instance benzyltriethylammonium bromide, facilitates the migration of the hydroxide in the organic phase.

HCCl_{3} + NaOH → CCl_{2} + NaCl + H_{2}O

=== Other reagents and routes ===
Another precursor to dichlorocarbene is ethyl trichloroacetate. Upon treatment with sodium methoxide it releases CCl_{2}.

Phenyl(trichloromethyl)mercury decomposes thermally to release CCl_{2}.

PhHgCCl_{3} → CCl_{2} + PhHgCl

Dichlorodiazirine, which is stable in the dark, decomposes into dichlorocarbene and nitrogen via photolysis.

(a) Cyanogen bromide (b) hydroxylamine (c) mesyl chloride (d) sodium hypochlorite (e) nitronium tetrafluoroborate (f) caesium and tetrabutylammonium chlorides in an ionic liquid

Dichlorocarbene can also be obtained by dechlorination of carbon tetrachloride with magnesium with ultrasound chemistry. This method is tolerant to esters and carbonyl compounds because it does not involve strong base.

== Reactions ==
=== With alkenes ===
Dichlorocarbene reacts with alkenes in a formal [1+2]cycloaddition to form geminal dichlorocyclopropanes. These can be reduced to cyclopropanes or hydrolysed to give cyclopropanones by a geminal halide hydrolysis. Dichlorocyclopropanes may also be converted to allenes in the Skattebøl rearrangement.

Dichlorocarbene reacts with tetrachloroethylene to give hexachlorocyclopropane. A similar reaction occurs with trichloroethylene, yielding pentachlorocyclopropane.

=== With phenols ===
In the Reimer–Tiemann reaction dichlorocarbene reacts with phenols to give the ortho-formylated product. e.g. phenol to salicylaldehyde.

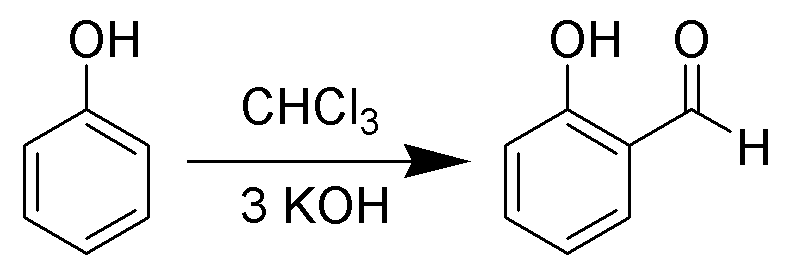

=== With amines ===
Dichlorocarbene is an intermediate in the carbylamine reaction. In this conversion, a dichloromethane solution of a primary amine is treated with chloroform and aqueous sodium hydroxide in the presence of catalytic amount of the phase-transfer catalyst. Illustrative is the synthesis of tert-butyl isocyanide:

Me_{3}CNH_{2} + CHCl_{3} + 3 NaOH → Me_{3}CNC + 3 NaCl + 3 H_{2}O

== History ==
In 1835, the French chemist Auguste Laurent recognised chloroform as CCl_{2}•HCl (then written as C_{8}Cl_{8}•H_{4}Cl_{4}) (Note: It was common for French chemists of 19th century to write molecular weights twice, seemingly Laurent also counted 2 molecules of chloroform. Combined with the inaccurate molecular weight of carbon in the early 19th century (considered half of what it really is), these resulted in a count of 8 carbons for 2 molecules of chloroform.) in his paper on analysing some organohalides. Laurent also described a compound seemingly consisting of 2 parts dichlorocarbene which he named Chlorétherose (Tetrachloroethylene).

Dichlorocarbene as a reactive intermediate was first proposed by Anton Geuther in 1862 who viewed chloroform as CCl_{2}^{.}HCl Its generation was reinvestigated by Jack Hine in 1950. The preparation of dichlorocarbene from chloroform and its utility in synthesis was reported by William von Eggers Doering in 1954.

== Related reactions ==
The Doering–LaFlamme allene synthesis entails the conversion of alkenes to allenes (a chain extension) with magnesium or sodium metal through initial reaction of the alkene with dichlorocarbene. The same sequence is incorporated in the Skattebøl rearrangement to cyclopentadienes.

Closely related is the more reactive dibromocarbene CBr_{2}.

== Chlorocarbene ==
The related chlorocarbene (ClHC) can be generated from methyllithium and dichloromethane. It has been used in the synthesis of spiropentadiene.

== See also ==
- Tetrachloroethylene (CCl_{2})_{2}
- Octachlorocyclobutane (CCl_{2})_{4}
- Difluorocarbene
