= Nonclassical ion =

Type of molecule in organic chemistry

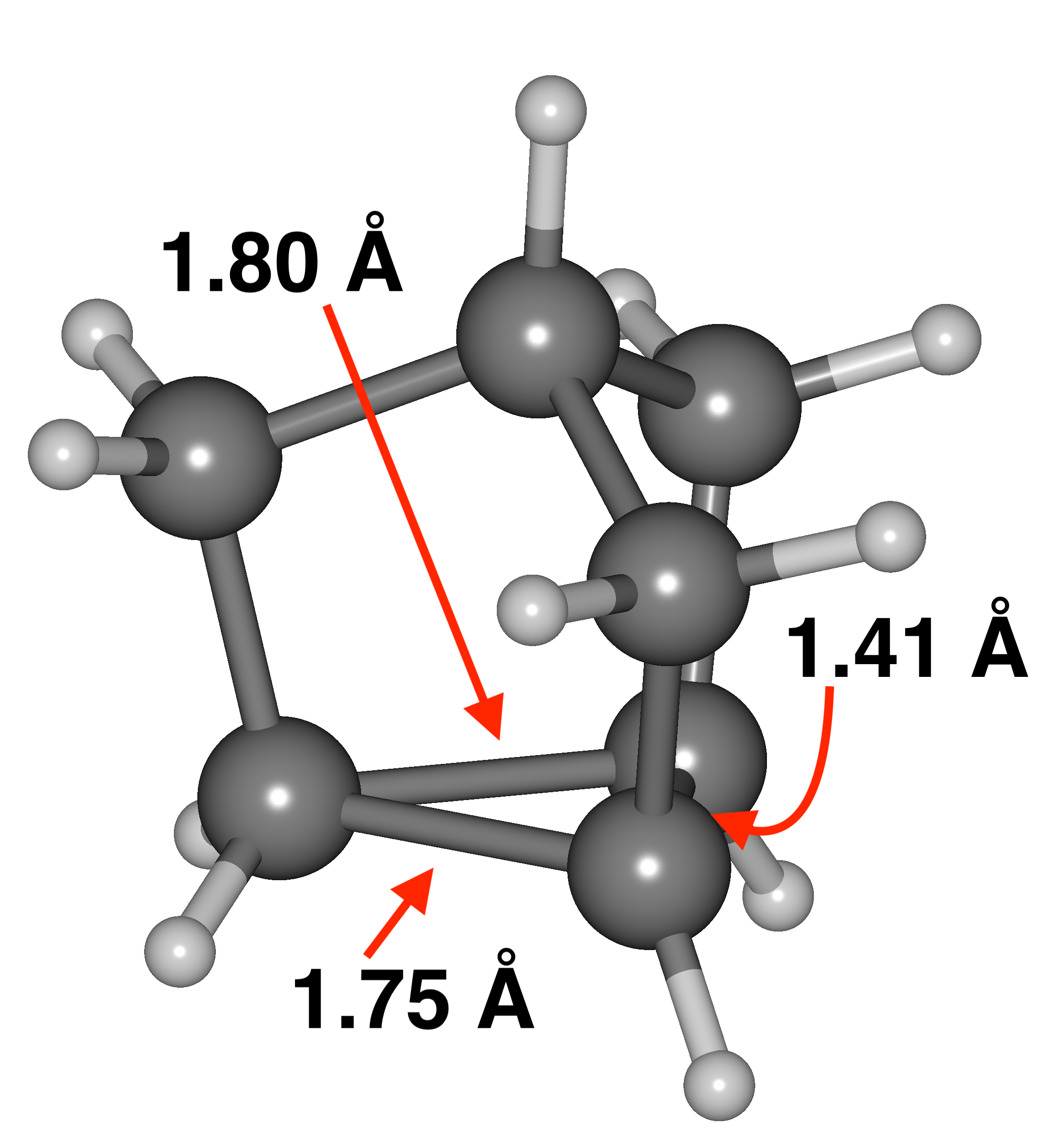
Structure of the 2-norbornyl cation, an iconic nonclassical ion. The structure was deduced from X-ray crystallography. C-C bond lengths not labeled are normal (ca. 1.5 Å).

In chemistry, a nonclassical ion usually refers to carbonium ions, a family of organic cations. They are characterized by delocalized three-center, two-electron bonds. The more stable members are often bi- or polycyclic.

== Examples ==
Historically, nonclassical ions were invoked to explain unusually fast solvolyses of steroidal, norbornyl, and cyclopropyl halides. Explanations for these rates was once controversial.

The 2-norbornyl cation is one of the best characterized carbonium ions:

C_{7}H_{10} + H^{+} → C_{7}H^{+}_{11}

In fact, it has emerged as the prototype for non-classical ions. As indicated first by low-temperature NMR spectroscopy and confirmed by X-ray crystallography, it has a symmetric structure with an RCH^{+}_{2} group bonded to an alkene group, stabilized by a bicyclic structure.

Solvolyses of cyclopropylcarbinyl, cyclobutyl, and homoallyl esters are also characterized by very large rates, and have been shown to occur via a common nonclassical ion structure in the form of a bicyclobutonium ion.

== See also ==
- 2-Norbornyl cation
- Neighbouring group participation
- Carbocation
- Steric effects
- Solvation
