= Ammonolysis =

Any chemical reaction with ammonia as a reactant

In chemistry, ammonolysis (/am·mo·nol·y·sis/) is the process of splitting ammonia into $\ce{NH2- + H+}$. Ammonolysis reactions can be conducted with organic compounds to produce amines (molecules containing a nitrogen atom with a lone pair, :N), or with inorganic compounds to produce nitrides. This reaction is analogous to hydrolysis in which water molecules are split. Similar to water, liquid ammonia also undergoes auto-ionization, $\ce{{2 NH3 ⇌ NH4+ + NH2- }}$, where the rate constant is k = 1.9 × 10^{−38}.

Organic compounds such as alkyl halides, hydroxyls (hydroxyl nitriles and carbohydrates), carbonyl (aldehydes/ketones/esters/alcohols), and sulfur (sulfonyl derivatives) can all undergo ammonolysis in liquid ammonia.

== Organic synthesis ==
=== Mechanism: Ammonolysis of Esters ===
This mechanism is similar to the hydrolysis of esters; the ammonia attacks the electrophilic carbonyl carbon, forming a tetrahedral intermediate. The reformation of the C-O double bond ejects the ester. The alkoxide deprotonates the ammonia, forming an alcohol and amide as products.

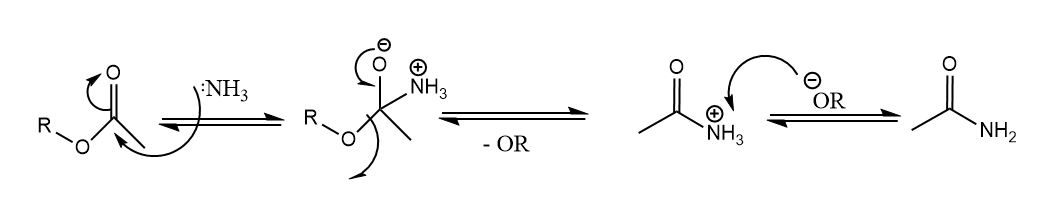
Ammonolysis of esters

=== Of haloalkanes ===
On heating a haloalkane and concentrated ammonia in a sealed tube with ethanol, a series of amines are formed along with their salts. The tertiary amine is usually the major product.

$$\ce{NH3 ->[\ce{RX}] RNH2 ->[\ce{RX}] R2NH ->[\ce{RX}] R3N ->[\ce{RX}] R4N+}$$

This is known as Hoffmann's ammonolysis.

=== Of alcohols ===
Alcohols can also undergo ammonolysis when in the presence of ammonia. An example is the conversion of phenol to aniline, catalyzed by stannic chloride.

$$\ce{ROH + NH3 A ->[\ce{SnCl4}]  RNH2 + H2O}$$

=== Of carbonyl compounds ===
The reaction between a ketone and ammonia results in an imine and byproduct water. This reaction is water sensitive and thus drying agents such as aluminum chloride or a Dean–Stark apparatus must be employed to remove water. The resulting imine will react and decompose back into the ketone and the ammonia when in the presence of water. This is due to the fact that this reaction is reversible:

$$\ce{R2CO + NH3  <=>  R2CNH + H2O}$$.

== Inorganic synthesis ==
Ammonolysis can be used to synthesize nitrides (and oxynitrides) by reacting various metal precursors with ammonia, some options include chemical vapor deposition, treating metals or metal oxides with ammonia gas, or liquid supercritical ammonia (also known as "ammonothermal" synthesis, analogous to hydrothermal synthesis).

$$\ce{M + NH3 -> MN + 3/2 H2}$$

$$\ce{MO2 + 4/3 NH3 -> MN + 2 H2O + 1/6 N2}$$

The products of these reactions may be complex, with mixtures of oxygen, nitrogen, and hydrogen that can be difficult to characterize.
