= 1,2-rearrangement =

Organic chemical reaction

A 1,2-rearrangement or 1,2-migration or 1,2-shift or Whitmore 1,2-shift is an organic reaction where a substituent moves from one atom to another atom in a chemical compound. In a 1,2 shift the movement involves two adjacent atoms but moves over larger distances are possible. In the example below the substituent R moves from carbon atom C^{2} to C^{3}.

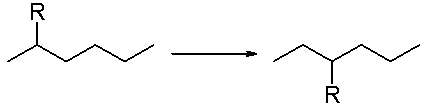
1,2-shift

The rearrangement is intramolecular and the starting compound and reaction product are structural isomers. The 1,2-rearrangement belongs to a broad class of chemical reactions called rearrangement reactions.

A rearrangement involving a hydrogen atom is called a 1,2-hydride shift. If the substituent being rearranged is an alkyl group, it is named according to the alkyl group's anion: i.e. 1,2-methanide shift, 1,2-ethanide shift, etc.

== Reaction mechanism ==
A 1,2-rearrangement is often initialised by the formation of a reactive intermediate such as:

- a carbocation by heterolysis in a nucleophilic rearrangement or anionotropic rearrangement
- a carbanion in an electrophilic rearrangement or cationotropic rearrangement
- a free radical by homolysis
- a nitrene.

The driving force for the actual migration of a substituent in step two of the rearrangement is the formation of a more stable intermediate. For instance a tertiary carbocation is more stable than a secondary carbocation and therefore the S_{N}1 reaction of neopentyl bromide with ethanol yields tert-pentyl ethyl ether.

Carbocation rearrangements are more common than the carbanion or radical counterparts. This observation can be explained on the basis of Hückel's rule. A cyclic carbocationic transition state is aromatic and stabilized because it holds 2 electrons. In an anionic transition state on the other hand 4 electrons are present thus antiaromatic and destabilized. A radical transition state is neither stabilized or destabilized.

The most important carbocation 1,2-shift is the Wagner–Meerwein rearrangement. A carbanionic 1,2-shift is involved in the benzilic acid rearrangement.

== Radical 1,2-rearrangements ==
The first radical 1,2-rearrangement reported by Heinrich Otto Wieland in 1911 was the conversion of bis(triphenylmethyl)peroxide 1 to the tetraphenylethane 2.

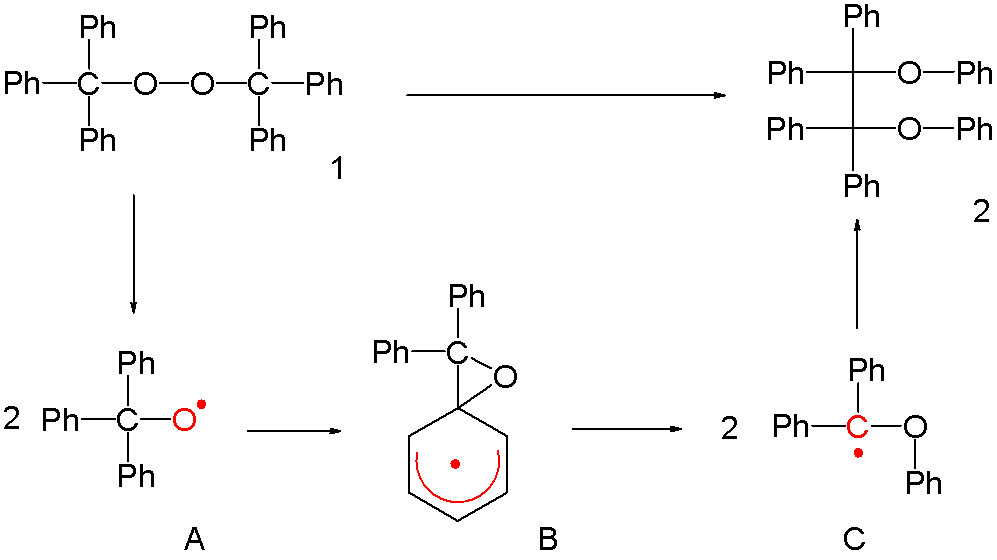
Radical 1,2-rearrangement

The reaction proceeds through the triphenylmethoxyl radical A, a rearrangement to diphenylphenoxymethyl C and its dimerization. It is unclear to this day whether in this rearrangement the cyclohexadienyl radical intermediate B is a transition state or a reactive intermediate as it (or any other such species) has thus far eluded detection by ESR spectroscopy.

An example of a less common radical 1,2-shift can be found in the gas phase pyrolysis of certain polycyclic aromatic compounds. The energy required in an aryl radical for the 1,2-shift can be high (up to 60 kcal/mol or 250 kJ/mol) but much less than that required for a proton abstraction to an aryne (82 kcal/mol or 340 kJ/mol). In alkene radicals proton abstraction to an alkyne is preferred.

Aryl radical 1,2-shift in a helicene

== 1,2-Rearrangements ==
The following mechanisms involve a 1,2-rearrangement:

- 1,2-Wittig rearrangement
- Alpha-ketol rearrangement
- Beckmann rearrangement
- Benzilic acid rearrangement
- Brook rearrangement
- Criegee rearrangement
- Curtius rearrangement
- Dowd–Beckwith ring expansion reaction
- Favorskii rearrangement
- Friedel–Crafts reaction
- Fritsch–Buttenberg–Wiechell rearrangement
- Halogen dance rearrangement
- Hofmann rearrangement
- Lossen rearrangement
- Pinacol rearrangement
- Seyferth–Gilbert homologation
- S_{N}1 reaction (generally)
- Stevens rearrangement
- Stieglitz rearrangement
- Wagner–Meerwein rearrangement
- Westphalen–Lettré rearrangement
- Wolff rearrangement
