= Stieglitz rearrangement =

Reaction in organic chemistry

| Named after | Julius Stieglitz |
| Reaction type | Rearrangement reaction |

Examples and Related Reactions
| Similar reactions | Beckmann rearrangement |

In organic chemistry, the Stieglitz rearrangement is a rearrangement reaction, the 1,2-rearrangement of tertiary-substituted amine derivatives to imines.

The reaction was first investigated by the American chemist Julius Stieglitz (1867–1937) and Paul Nicholas Leech in 1913. In their original reports, phosphorus pentachloride activated the hydroxyl in a triaryl hydroxylamine as a leaving group. The resulting dehydration induced shift of a phenyl group to yield the corresponding Schiff base:

Stieglitz Rearrangement hydroxylamines

Although generally associated with triaryl hydroxylamines in acid, the reaction can be performed with a wide variety of leaving groups at N. Stieglitz rearrangements can occur with alkoxyl-, acetoxyl-, and sulfonoxylamines, haloamines and azides.

The Beckmann rearrangement is an unsaturated analogue, being the acid rearrangement of a ketoxime.

== General mechanism ==
Mechanism of a Beckmann rearrangement

The Stieglitz rearrangement's mechanism is closely related to the Beckmann rearrangement. Both rearrangement reactions involve a carbon to nitrogen shift, usually after Lewis acid activation of a leaving group on the nitrogen atom. The main difference is the starting materials' saturation degree: a Stieglitz rearrangement takes place on saturated amine derivatives with a σ-single bond, while the Beckmann rearrangement occurs on an oxime with a C=N-double bond.

The first step of a Stieglitz rearrangement is acid-catalyzed carbon-to-nitrogen migration to give an iminium ion. This product then quenches through simple deprotonation:

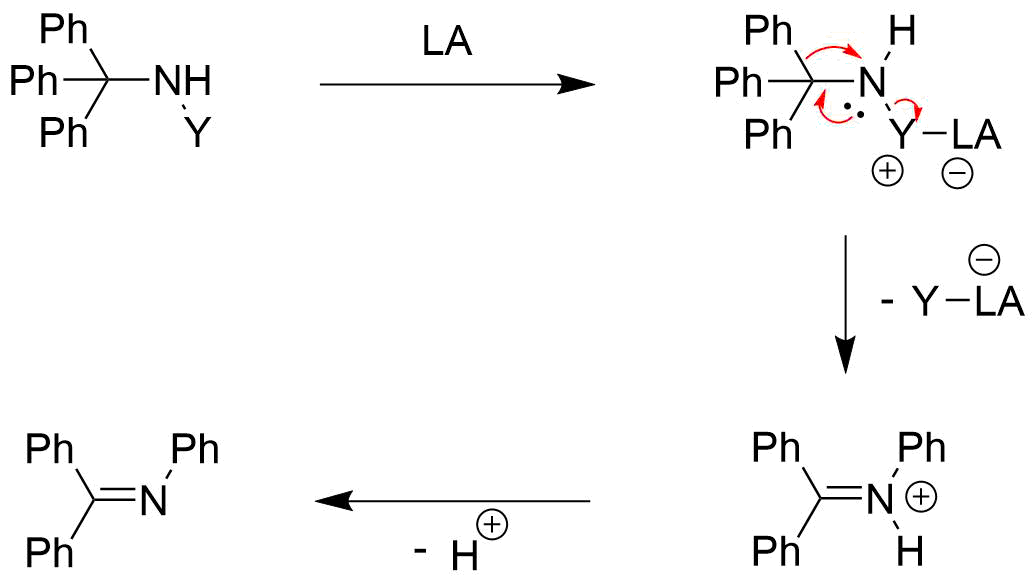
Abstracted, simplified and generalized mechanism for a Lewis acid mediated Stieglitz rearrangement, Y = OH, OR, LA = Lewis acid = BF_{3}, "PCl_{4}^{+}"

== Leaving groups ==
Many acids can activate trityl hydroxylamines to the reaction. Phosphorus pentachloride (PCl_{5}), phosphorus pentoxide (P_{2}O_{5}) and boron trifluoride (BF_{3}) have all been applied successfully.

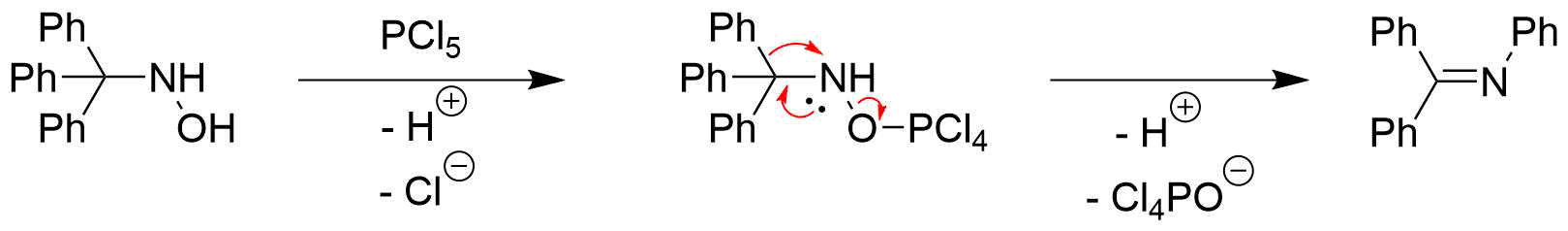
Stieglitz rearrangement of triaryl hydroxylamine

N-Alkoxy tritylamines react through the same mechanism but with intrinsically much lower yields. For example, N-benzyloxytritylamine gives only 40% product with phosphorus pentachloride at 160 °C and 29% product with BF_{3} at 60 °C.

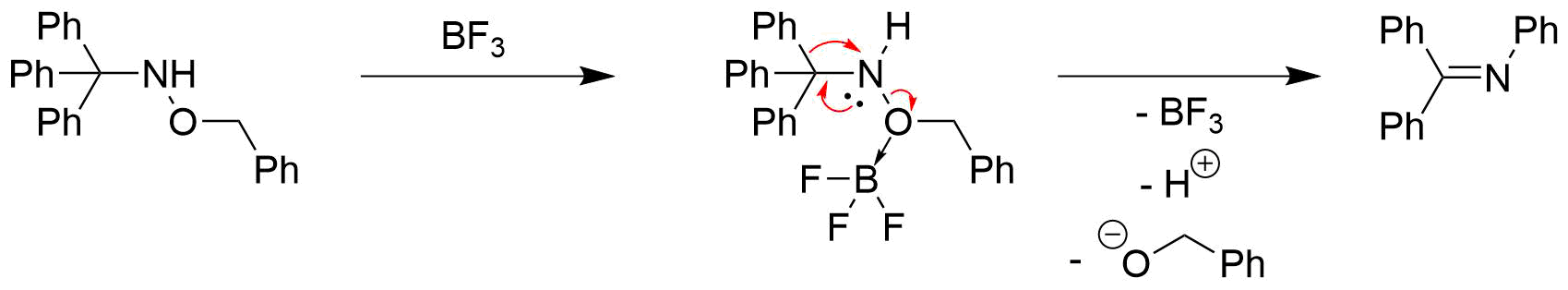
Stieglitz rearrangement benzyloxy substituted amine

Better leaving groups induce the reaction with milder acids, or even basic conditions. Sulfonoxylamines, for example, undergo the reaction when exposed to silica gel, and certain bridged bicyclic sulfonoxylamines rearrange spontaneously in room-temperature, aqueous dioxane. In the latter case, the stabilized norbornyl-like cation intermediate quenches by re-adding the tosylate elsewhere, not the formation of an anti-Bredt imine:

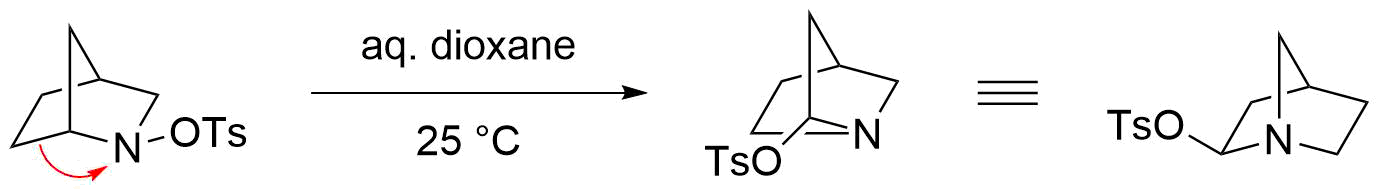
Stieglitz rearrangement on a sulfonated amine

N-Chloro- and bromoamines generally require a base, such as sodium methoxide, to deprotonate the amine:

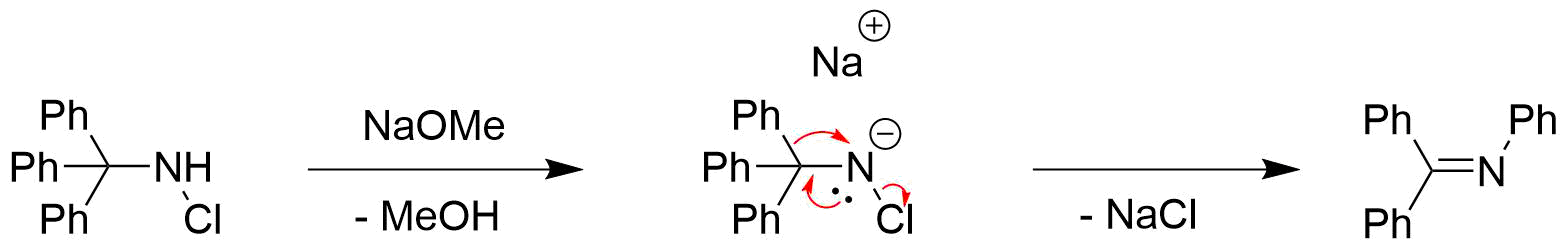
Stieglitz rearrangement N-haloamines

Organic azides, especially under protonic and/or thermal activation, perform the rearrangement with a dinitrogen leaving group. A variant forms the azide in situ from carbocation attack on hydrazoic acid. A reactive nitrene intermediate has been proposed for this reaction, although the analogous intermediate is now considered unlikely in the Curtius rearrangement.

== Other variations ==
=== Stieglitz oxidation ===
It was also observed, that the addition of lead tetraacetate can facilitate the Stieglitz rearrangement of amine derivatives, forming an acetoxyamine in situ.

=== Stieglitz reduction ===
An amino-substituted hydroxylamine cannot complete the Stieglitz reduction, as it lacks an amino proton to quench the iminium intermediate. Instead, the neutral state can be achieved with an external reducing agent, which produces the corresponding saturated amine (a reductive amination). For example, Grieco et al's total synthesis of (±)-lycopodine involves the Stieglitz rearrangment of a tertiary N-chloroamine, induced by halophilic Ag^{+} cation from AgBF_{4}:

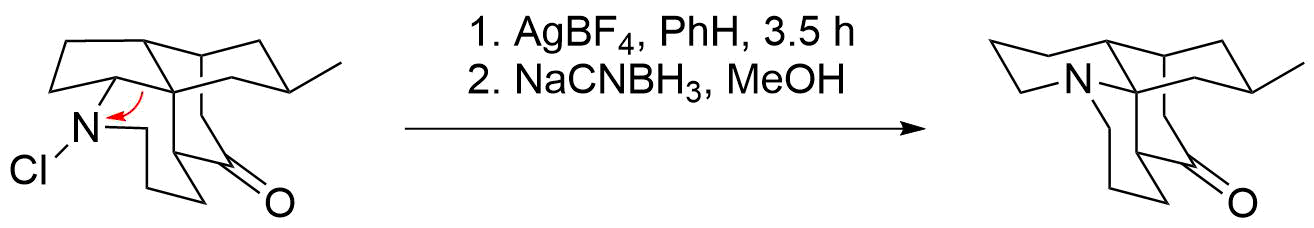

The desired product is then obtained from the iminium by sodium cyanoborohydride reduction.

== See also ==
- Beckmann rearrangement
- Curtius rearrangement
- Dakin oxidation
- Schmidt reaction
