= Meerwein =

Meerwein is a surname. Notable people with the surname include:

- Carl Friedrich Meerwein, German engineer
- Hans Meerwein, German chemist

Meerwein may also refer to several chemical terms named after Hans Meerwein:

- Meerwein arylation
- Meerwein–Ponndorf–Verley reduction
- Meerwein's salt
- Wagner–Meerwein rearrangement
