= Julius Stieglitz =

American chemist (1867–1937)

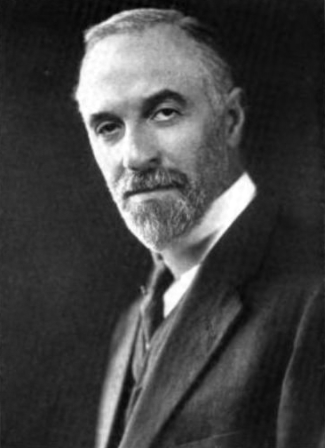
- Born: May 26, 1867; Hoboken, New Jersey, United States
- Died: January 10, 1937 (aged 69); Chicago, Illinois
- Education: University of Berlin
- Known for: Stieglitz rearrangement
- Awards: Willard Gibbs Award (1923)
- Scientific career
- Workplaces: University of Göttingen, Clark University, University of Chicago, University of Marburg
- Doctoral advisor: Ferdinand Tiemann

Julius Oscar Stieglitz (May 26, 1867 – January 10, 1937) was an American chemist of German Jewish origin. He was a teacher and organic chemist with a major interest in pharmaceutical and medicinal chemistry. He is known for the Stieglitz rearrangement, a rearrangement reaction in organic chemistry which commonly involves the formation of imines from hydroxylamines through a carbon to nitrogen shift, comparable to the key step of a Beckmann rearrangement.

During the early stages of his career, he worked for Parke, Davis & Co. in Detroit as a toxicologist. After attending private and public schools in New York during his early years, both he and his twin brother Leopold were sent to Germany for their higher education. He went to the Gymnasium in Germany and studied at the University of Berlin, where he received his PhD in chemistry in 1889 with Ferdinand Tiemann. Following a short period of study with Victor Meyer at Göttingen, he returned to the U.S. in 1890. In 1892 Stieglitz started working at the University of Chicago, where his whole career until his retirement took place.

Julius and his twin brother Leopold were born in Hoboken, New Jersey on May 26, 1867, to Edward Stieglitz (1833–1909) and Hedwig Ann Werner (1845–1922). His elder brother was the photographer Alfred Stieglitz. He married Anna Stieffel on August 28, 1891.

He began his career at the University of Chicago in 1892 as an unpaid docent, lecturing without salary and sustaining himself from student donations. In 1893 he was appointed assistant professor, and moved up through the ranks to become professor of chemistry in 1905. He served as department chair from 1915 to 1933.

In 1933, he was named professor emeritus but continued to teach and serve as board chair of the American Chemical Society. Dr. Stieglitz was very active in ACS, serving as the Chicago Section Chair in 1904, and ACS President in 1917. In 1911, he was elected to the National Academy of Sciences. He was elected to the American Academy of Arts and Sciences in 1914 and the American Philosophical Society in 1919. Stieglitz helped to establish the Willard Gibbs Medal, and received the Gibbs Medal himself in 1923. He received honorary doctorates from Clark University (D.Sc.) and the University of Pittsburgh (Ph.D.).

He died in Chicago on January 10, 1937.

== Stieglitz Lecture ==
The Stieglitz Lecture was established using funds dedicated in his memorial legacy in 1940. The lecture was presented alternatively by the University of Chicago Chemistry department and the Chicago Section of the ACS in consecutive years until 1994. There was a pause in presentation from 1994 until 1999 until the funds built up to a level where they were sufficient to support a stipend of $1,000 plus expenses for each year.
