= Meerwein reaction (disambiguation) =

Meerwein reaction may also refer to several chemical reactions named after Hans Meerwein:

- Meerwein arylation
- Meerwein–Ponndorf–Verley reduction
- Wagner–Meerwein rearrangement
