= Wilhelm Lossen =

German chemist (1838–1906)

Wilhelm Clemens Lossen
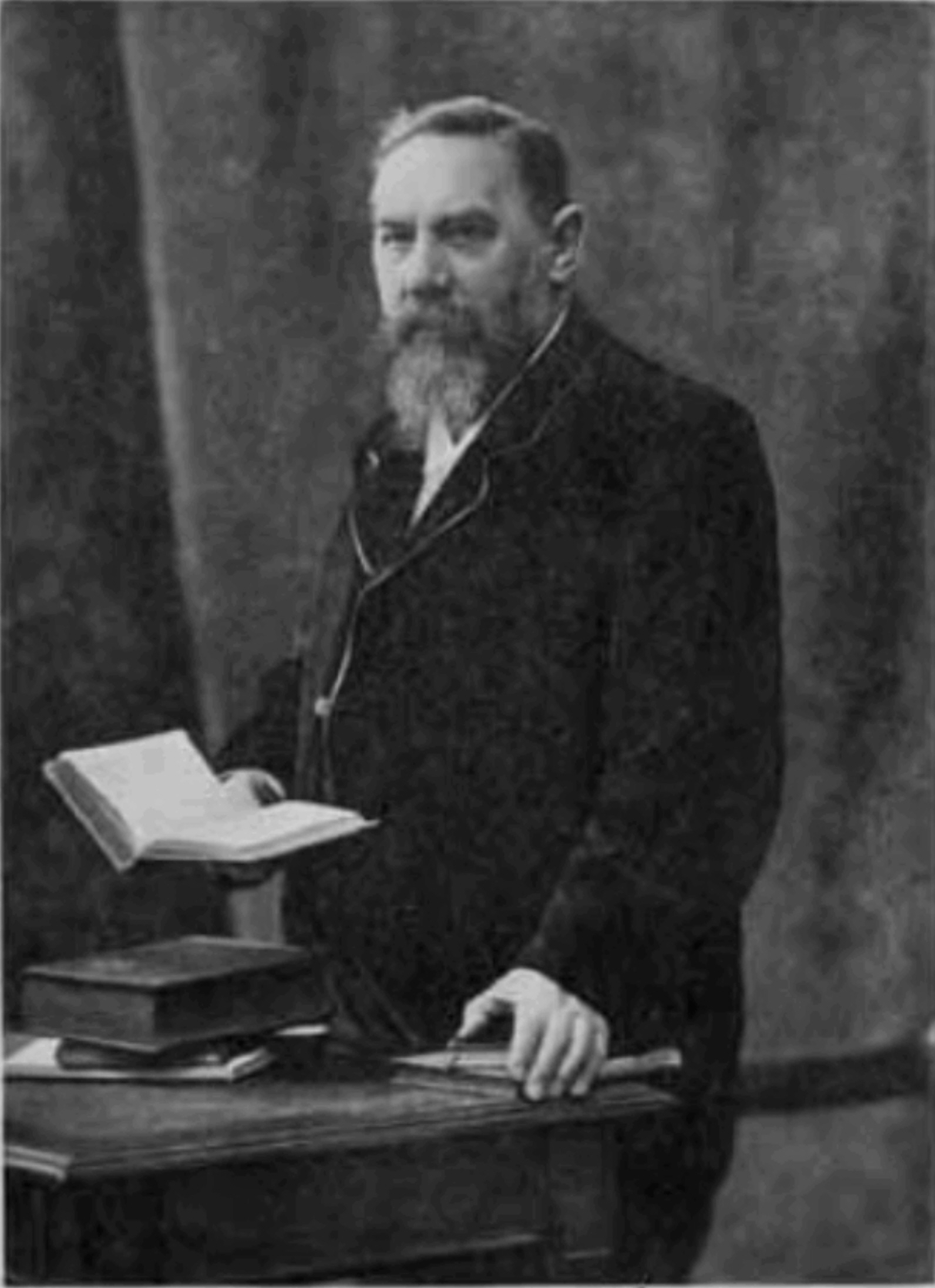
- Born: May 8, 1838; Kreuznach, Germany
- Died: October 29, 1906 (aged 68); Aachen, Germany
- Education: University of Giessen, University of Göttingen
- Known for: Lossen rearrangement, discovery of the chemical formula of cocaine
- Relatives: Karl August Lossen, Lina Lossen
- Scientific career
- Fields: Chemistry
- Institutions: University of Königsberg, University of Heidelberg
- Academic advisors: Friedrich Wöhler, Albert Niemann

Wilhelm Clemens Lossen (8 May 1838 in Kreuznach – 29 October 1906 in Aachen) was a German chemist. He was the brother of geologist Karl August Lossen.

From 1857 he studied chemistry at the University of Giessen, then continued his education at Göttingen as a pupil of Friedrich Wöhler. After graduation, he worked as an assistant to Karl Weltzien at the polytechnic in Karlsruhe and as an assistant under Wilhelm Heinrich Heintz at the University of Halle. In 1870 he became an associate professor at Heidelberg, then in 1877 accepted a position as professor of chemistry at the University of Königsberg.

He is largely known for his work with hydroxylamines; their preparations, properties and derivatives. The eponymous Lossen rearrangement, refers to the decomposition of hydroxamic acids or their derivatives to yield isocyanates. While a student at Göttingen, he conducted research of cocaine with Albert Niemann. After the untimely death of Niemann in 1861, he continued research of the drug and was able to determine its proper chemical formula. The two scientists also performed studies on the effect of cocaine on mucous membranes.

== Selected works ==
- Über das Cocain, 1862 (with Friedrich Wöhler), dissertation.
- Ausbildung und Examina der Chemiker, 1897.
- Der Anteil der Katholiken am akademischen Lehramte in Preussen. Nach statistischen Untersuchungen, 1901.
- Offener Brief an Albert Ladenburg und offene Anfrage an den Vorstand der Gesellschaft deutscher Naturforscher und Aerzte, 1903.
- Lossen, Wilhelm (1899). Beiträge zur Kenntnis der desinfizierenden Wirkung des Chloroforms.
