= IUPAC nomenclature for organic chemical transformations =

IUPAC methodology for naming chemical reactions

The IUPAC Nomenclature for Organic Chemical Transformations is a methodology for naming a chemical reaction.

Traditionally, most chemical reactions, especially in organic chemistry, are named after their inventors, the so-called name reactions, such as Knoevenagel condensation, Wittig reaction, Claisen–Schmidt condensation, Schotten–Baumann reaction, and Diels–Alder reaction. A lot of reactions derive their name from the reagent involved like bromination or acylation. On rare occasions, the reaction is named after the company responsible like in the Wacker process or the name only hints at the process involved like in the halogen dance rearrangement.

The IUPAC Nomenclature for Transformations was developed in 1981 and presents a clear-cut methodology for naming an organic reaction. It incorporates the reactant and product in a chemical transformation together with one of three transformation types:

- Addition reactions end with -addition. For example: hydro-bromo-addition for the hydrobromination of an alkene
- Elimination reactions end with -elimination. For example: dibromo-elimination.
- Substitution reactions have the infix -de-. For example: methoxy-de-bromination for the chemical reaction of a bromo-alkane to an alkoxy-alkane

The related IUPAC nomenclature of chemistry is designed for naming organic compounds themselves.

== Notes and references ==
- Jones, R.A.Y.; Bunnett, J.F. (1989). "Nomenclature for Organic Chemical Transformations (Recommendations 1988)" (Free fulltext). Pure and Applied Chemistry. 61 (4). IUPAC: 725–768. doi:10.1351/pac198961040725. S2CID 98538653.
- March, Jerry (1985). Advanced organic chemistry: reactions, mechanisms, and structure. New York: Wiley. ISBN 0-471-85472-7.
