= Weerman degradation =

Reaction in organic chemistry

Weerman degradation, also named Weerman reaction, is a name reaction in organic chemistry. It is named after Rudolf Adrian Weerman, who discovered it in 1910. In general, it is an organic reaction in carbohydrate chemistry in which amides are degraded by sodium hypochlorite, forming an aldehyde with one less carbon. Some have regarded it as an extension of the Hofmann rearrangement.

== Degradation of α-hydroxy-substituted carbonic acid amides ==
The Weermann degradation could be executed with α-hydroxy-substituted carbonic acid amides. For example, sugar.

=== General reaction scheme ===
During the degradation of α-hydroxy-substituted carbonic acid amides, the carbon chain shortens by one carbon-atom.

Weerman-Degradation

The reaction proceeds very slowly at room temperature, therefore the reaction mixture is heated up to 60-65 °C.

=== Mechanism ===
The reaction mechanism is that of the related Hofmann degradation.

Weermann degradation mechanism of Hydroxy-Carbonsäureamide

At first the carbonic acid amide (1) reacts with the sodium hypochlorite. After the separation of water and chloride an amine with a free bond is built 2. The intermediate (3) is generated by rearrangement. In the next step a hydrolysis takes place. Water is added at the carbon-atom with the number '1'. A hydroxylic group is generated. The last step is that an acidic amide is separated and the aldehyde (4) is generated.

== Degradation of α,β-unsaturated carbonic acid amides ==
Additionally the Weerman degradation could be executed with α,β-unsaturated carbonic acid amides. For example, acrylamide.

=== General reaction scheme ===
During the degradation of α,β-unsaturated amides, the carbon chain shortens about one carbon-atom, too.

Weermann degradation general unsattuered carbonic acid amides

The reaction is very slow at room temperature, therefore the reaction mixture is heated up to 60–65 °C.

=== Mechanism ===
The reaction mechanism is that of the related Hofmann degradation.

Weermann degradation 1st unsattuered

At first the carbonic acid amide (1) reacts with the sodium hypochlorite. After separate water and chloride an amine with a free bond is built 2. The intermediate (3) is generated by rearrangement. At this point two different mechanisms are possible. In the mechanism above two methanol molecules reacts with the intermediate. So is the compound (4) generated. After this carbon dioxide, water, ammonium and methanol are separated in different steps. At least it is protonated into an aldehyde (5).

Weermann degradation 2nd unsattuered

Until the intermediate (3) the mechanism is the same like above. Then only one methanol-atom is added 4. With a protonation water, methanol and carbon dioxide are separated. An ammonium ion (5) is generated. During the hydrolysis a hydroxylic group is built 6. An aldehyde (7) is generated by separating an ammonium ion.

== Applications ==
One study demonstrated the direct oxidation of glucose to arabinose by the same sodium hypochlorite, skipping the aldonic acid and aldoamide steps. For example, the general degradation of D-gluconamide into D-arabinose:

Sugar example

On top of that, the Weerman test could be used to show whether a hydroxylic group is beside the amido group. This reaction is only important in a historical sense because it is slow yielding and thus rarely used.

== See also ==
- Curtius rearrangement
- Hofmann degradation
- Ruff–Fenton degradation
- Wohl degradation
