= Hofmann rearrangement =

Type of chemical reaction

Named after	August Wilhelm von Hofmann
Reaction type	Rearrangement reaction

Identifiers
RSC ontology ID	RXNO:0000410

The Hofmann rearrangement (Hofmann degradation) is the organic reaction of a primary amide to a primary amine with one less carbon atom. The reaction involves oxidation of the nitrogen followed by rearrangement of the carbonyl and nitrogen to give an isocyanate intermediate. The reaction can form a wide range of products, including alkyl and aryl amines.

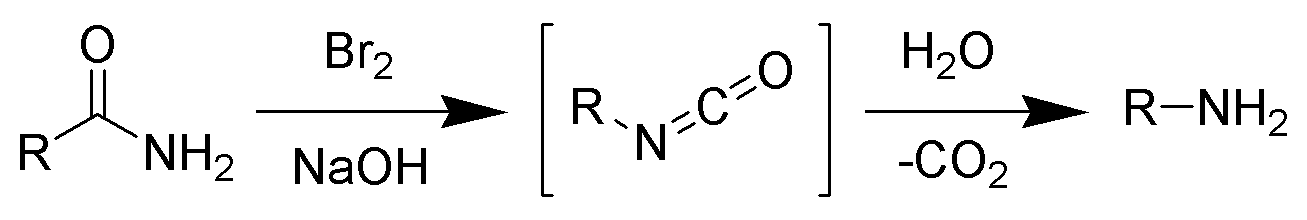
The Hofmann rearrangement

The reaction is named after its discoverer, August Wilhelm von Hofmann, and should not be confused with the Hofmann elimination, another name reaction for which he is eponymous.

== Mechanism ==
The reaction of bromine with sodium hydroxide forms sodium hypobromite in situ, which transforms the primary amide into an intermediate isocyanate. The formation of an intermediate nitrene is not possible because it implies also the formation of a hydroxamic acid as a byproduct, which has never been observed. The intermediate isocyanate is hydrolyzed to a primary amine, giving off carbon dioxide.

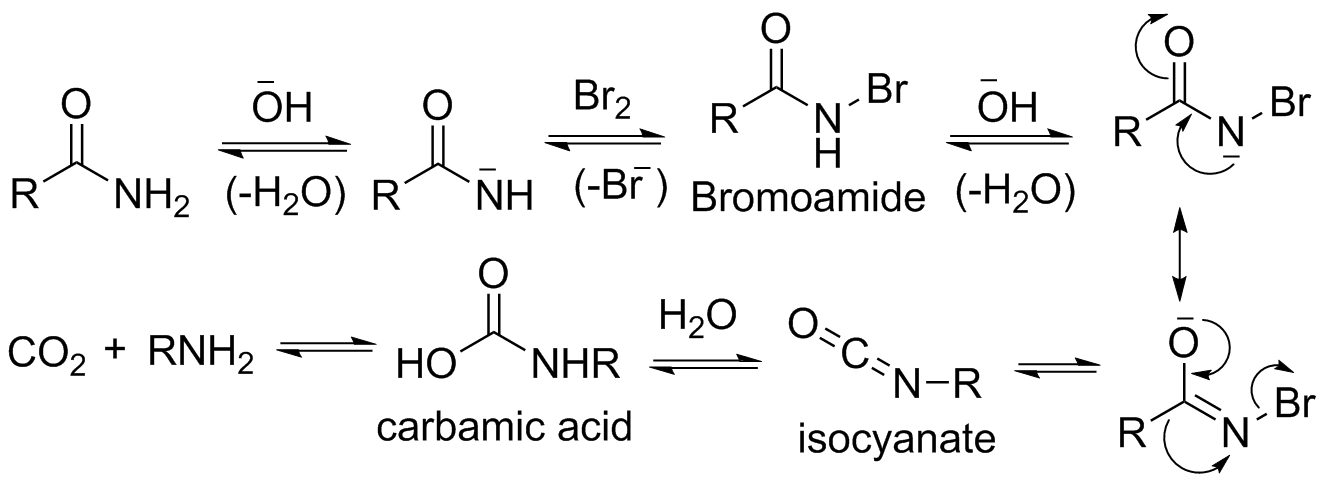

1. Base abstracts an acidic N-H proton, yielding an anion.
2. The anion reacts with bromine in an α-substitution reaction to give an N-bromoamide.
3. Base abstraction of the remaining amide proton gives a bromoamide anion.
4. The bromoamide anion rearranges as the R group attached to the carbonyl carbon migrates to nitrogen at the same time the bromide ion leaves, giving an isocyanate.
5. The isocyanate adds water in a nucleophilic addition step to yield a carbamic acid (aka urethane).
6. The carbamic acid spontaneously loses CO_{2}, yielding the amine product.

== Variations ==
Several reagents can be substituted for bromine. Sodium hypochlorite, lead tetraacetate, N-bromosuccinimide, and (bis(trifluoroacetoxy)iodo)benzene have all been used for Hofmann rearrangements.

The intermediate isocyanate can be trapped with various nucleophiles to form stable carbamates or other products rather than undergoing decarboxylation. In the following example, the intermediate isocyanate is trapped by methanol.

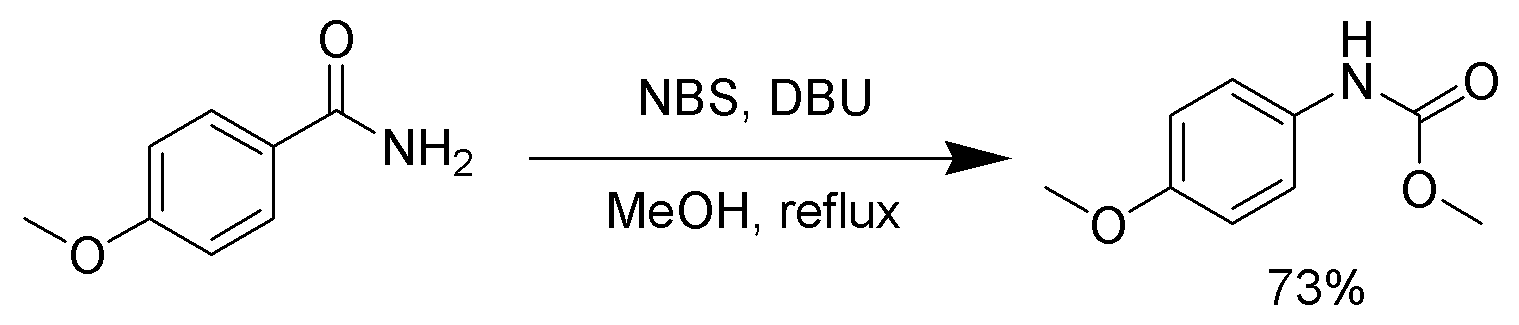
Formation of a carbamate ester via a Hofmann rearrangement using NBS and DBU

In a similar fashion, the intermediate isocyanate can be trapped by tert-butyl alcohol, yielding the tert-butoxycarbonyl (Boc)-protected amine.

The Hofmann Rearrangement also can be used to yield carbamates from α,β-unsaturated or α-hydroxy amides or nitriles from α,β-acetylenic amides in good yields (≈70%).

In the Schestakov rearrangement, the substrate is a urea and the product a diacyl hydrazide.

== Applications ==
- The preparation of anthranilic acid from phthalimide
- The conversion of Nicotinamide into 3-Aminopyridine
- A process for chemical synthesis and isolation of gabapentin with high yield and purity starts with conversion of 1,1-cyclohexanediacetic anhydride to an amide by reaction with a solution of ammonia in isopropanol and is followed by a Hofmann rearrangement in an freshly prepared aqueous solution of sodium hypobromite.

== See also ==
- Beckmann rearrangement
- Curtius rearrangement
- Haloform reaction
- Lossen rearrangement
- Schmidt reaction
- Weerman degradation
- Wolff rearrangement

== Bibliography ==
- Clayden, Jonathan (2007). Organic Chemistry. Oxford University Press Inc. pp. 1073. ISBN 978-0-19-850346-0.
- Fieser, Louis F. (1962). Advanced Organic Chemistry. Reinhold Publishing Corporation, Chapman & Hall, Ltd. pp. 499–501.
