= Richard Anschütz =

German chemist (1852–1937)

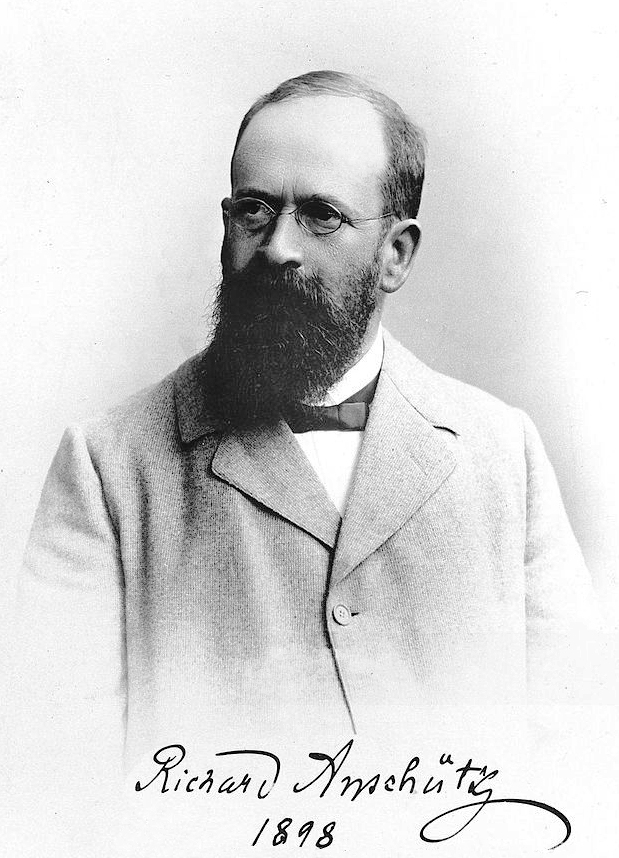
- Born: 10 March 1852; Darmstadt, German Confederation
- Died: 8 January 1937 (aged 84); Darmstadt, Germany
- Education: University of Bonn
- Scientific career
- Workplaces: University of Bonn
- Doctoral advisor: August Kekulé
- Doctoral students: Hans Meerwein

Carl Johann Philipp Noé Richard Anschütz FRSE (Hon) (10 March 1852 – 8 January 1937) was a German organic chemist.

Anschütz received his PhD at the University of Bonn for his work with August Kekulé. He became Kekulé's assistant and in 1898, his successor as Professor of Chemistry at the University of Bonn. His biography of Kekulé opened a view on the claims of Archibald Scott Couper as an independent co-discoverer of the ability of carbon atoms to link to each other to form chains (the theory of chemical structure).
