= Roskamp reaction =

Chemical reaction

Named after	Eric J. Roskamp
Reaction type	Coupling reaction

In organic chemistry, the Roskamp reaction is a name reaction describing the reaction between α-diazoesters (such as ethyl diazoacetate) and aldehydes to form β-ketoesters, often utilizing various Lewis acids (such as BF_{3}, SnCl_{2}, and GeCl_{2}) as catalysts. The reaction is notable for its mild reaction conditions and selectivity.

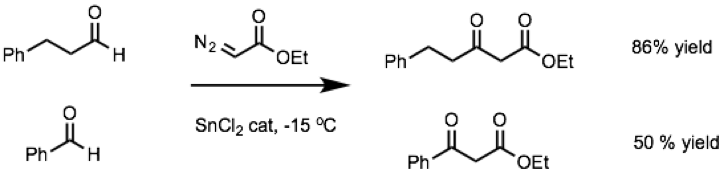

== Background ==
The Roskamp reaction was published seminally in 1989 by Roskamp and co-workers. The authors initially proposed that the reaction would convert aldehydes to alkenes via a pseudo-Wittig type reaction; however, β-ketoesters were the only products to be observed. The authors also noted that aliphatic aldehyde gave higher yield than aromatic aldehydes due to enolization. Additionally, the mild reaction conditions shows advantages in preventing side reactions and increasing functional group tolerance.

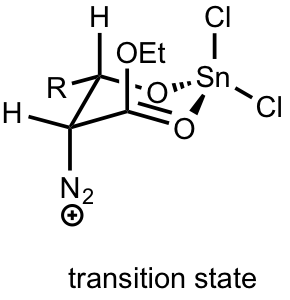

In 1992, Roskamp and co-workers expanded the scope of diazoacetate to diazo sulfones, diazo phosphonates and diazo phosphine oxides.

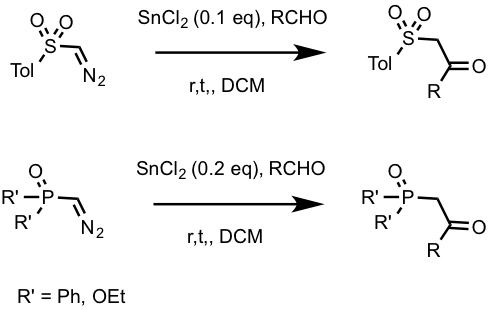

== Mechanism ==
Diazo compounds are ambiphilic reagents. According to its resonance structure, the carbon adjacent to the diazo group has partial negative charge. If R’ = H, this can be regarded as a hydride-transfer process.

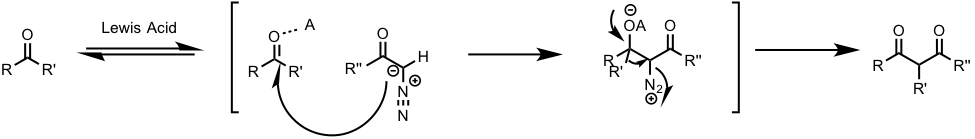

== Scope ==
Aldehydes containing protected amines are tolerated under Roskamp conditions. Olefins can be used to generate the desired aldehyde in situ through ozonolysis, where tin(II) chloride would serve as both the reducing agent in the ozonolysis step as well as the Lewis acid catalyst in the Roskamp reaction step.

== Asymmetric variants ==
=== Chiral auxiliary ===
In the Roskamp reaction, the alpha position of the formed β-ketoester can potentially be a chiral center, so asymmetric variants of the Roskamp reaction were investigated. In 2009, Maruoka and co-workers reported a Lewis acid-catalyzed asymmetric Roskamp reaction. The chiral information is introduced by chiral auxiliaries from the diazo compound.

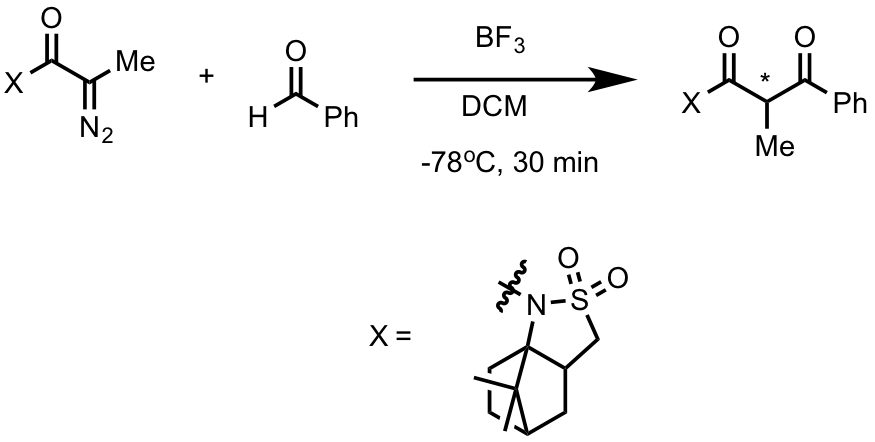

=== Roskamp–Feng reaction ===
In 2010, the Feng group developed a chiral Sc-catalyzed enantioselective Roskamp reaction, sometimes referred to as the Roskamp–Feng reaction, the first case of an asymmetric and catalytic Roskamp reaction. N,N’-dioxide-Sc(OTF)_{3} chiral ligands were used, an emerging class of privileged ligand from the Feng group.

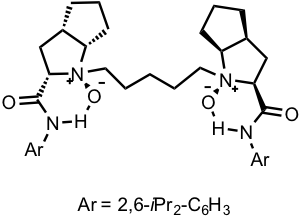
Feng ligand

A disadvantage of the Roskamp–Feng reaction is that the substrate is limited to aromatic aldehydes. The authors also demonstrated that the ketoester products can be further reduced to access chiral 1,3-diols, a useful class of building blocks in natural product synthesis.

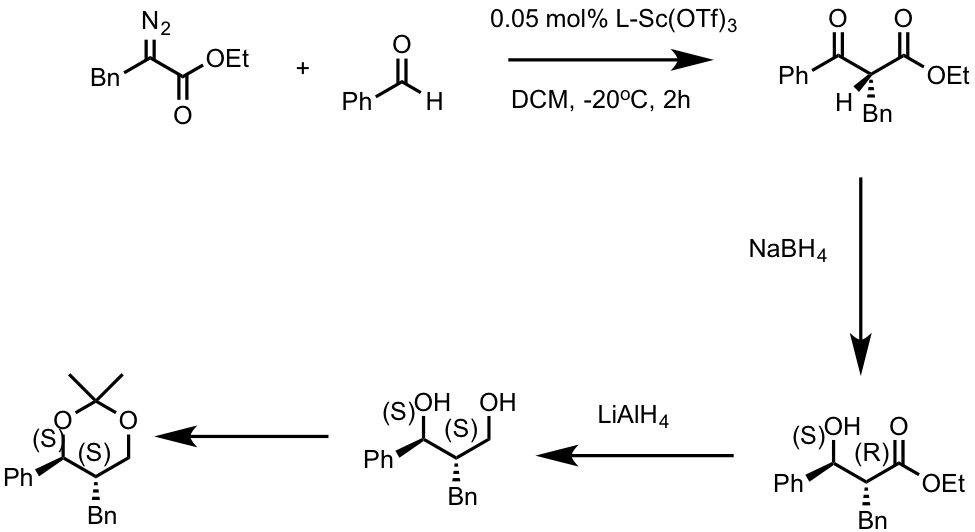

=== Other asymmetric reactions ===
In 2012, Do Hyun Ryu from Sungkyunkwan University developed a catalytic, asymmetric Roskamp reaction with broad applicability. They utilized oxazaborolidinium ion Lewis acid catalysts, which are generated from the corresponding oxazaborolidines by protonation with triflic acid.

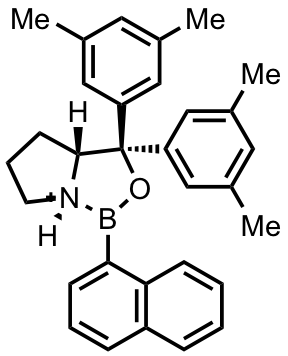
Oxazaborolidine catalyst

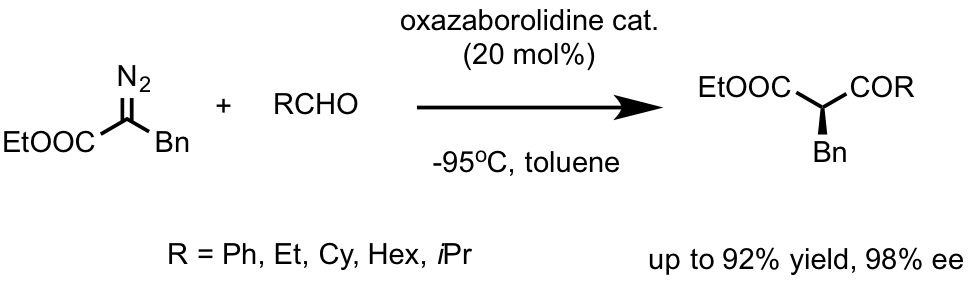

Compared to the Roskamp–Feng reaction, this method has a broader scope of aldehydes, notably being compatible with aliphatic aldehydes. In 2015, the same group reported asymmetric Roskamp reaction of the α-aryl diazo Weinreb amide, using the same chiral oxazaborolidine catalyst.

== Applications ==
The Roskamp reaction was utilized in the total synthesis of (+)-Galbulimima Alkaloid 13 and (+)-Himgaline.

== See also ==
- Büchner–Curtius–Schlotterbeck reaction
- Meerwein arylation
