= Nitrene C–H insertion =

Chemical reaction

Nitrene C–H insertion is a chemical reaction in which a nitrene, a monovalent nitrogen, inserts across a C–H bonds and yields an amine or amide C–N bond. This transformation provides a direct method for C–N bond formation, a key step in the synthesis of amines, amides, and other nitrogen-containing compounds. The mechanism is often facilitated by transition metal catalysts that stabilize reactive nitrene intermediates. Since its discovery in the early 1980s, nitrene C–H insertion has evolved into a powerful tool in synthetic organic chemistry to enable intra- and intermolecular amination strategies.

== Mechanism ==
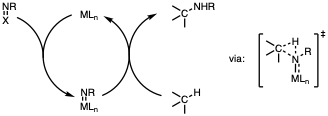
General Mechanism for Nitrene C–H Insertion

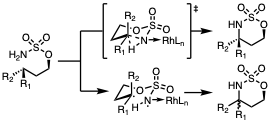
Concerted C–H Insertion versus C–H Abstraction Radical Rebound Mechanisms

The process of nitrene insertion across a C–H bond generally begins with in-situ formation of an iodonium ylide that generates the reactive metal-nitrene species that undergoes insertion. C–H insertion of a singlet nitrene proceeds with retention of stereochemistry analogous to that of singlet carbene insertion, which proceeds via a concerted pathway. In contrast, triplet nitrenes react by H-abstraction and radical recombination.

Regarding transition metal mediated C–H insertion, mechanistic studies reveal that in the rhodium catalyzed transformation the reactive oxidant is the Rh-bound nitrene and C–H insertion occurs via a concerted, asynchronous transition state. These insights were reported in 2009 by Du Bois. The published work details the mechanistic investigation of an intramolecular dirhodium tetracarboxylate-catalyzed sulfamate ester C–H amination. The stereospecificity of nitrene insertion mirrors that of the Rh-catalyzed carbene insertion which proceeds via an asynchronous, concerted mechanism. However, stereochemistry does not rule out a stepwise process that occurs by initial homolytic C–H abstraction followed by rapid radical rebound. A combination of reactivity trends, radical clock experiments, KIE measurements, and Hammett analysis was used to validate the concerted mechanism hypothesis.

== History ==
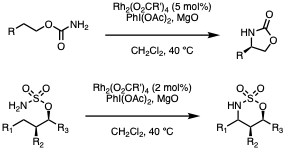
Intramolecular C–H Amination Using a Carbamate or Sulfamate Tether

The first example of a metal mediated nitrene insertion to generate C–N bonds was reported by Ronald Breslow and co-workers in 1982. Using Mn (III) or Fe (III) porphyrin, cyclohexane was reacted with (tosyliminoiodo)benzene to generate the sulfonamide. In 1983, Breslow then demonstrated that Rh_{2}(OAc)_{2} and PhI(OAc)_{2} can be used as catalyst and oxidant respectively to achieve an efficient metal-nitrene insertion reaction. In 1988, Daniel Mansuy and coworkers documented the analogous iron porphyrin-catalyzed intermolecular tosyamination, as well as a chemoselective manganese porphyrin-catalyzed allylic amination of simple alkenes, paving the way for future investigations.

Stemming from the pioneering work by Breslow, Espino and Du Bois described an intramolecular C–H amination that resolves selective C–H insertion of nitrogen through the regioselective internal delivery of a nitrene using a carbamate or sulfamate tether.

Over the ensuing decades, the field of metal-catalyzed nitrene C–H insertion has evolved significantly through the development of diverse nitrene precursors and the expansion beyond early porphyrin systems to include a wide range of transition metals, such as rhodium, cobalt, iron, copper, and ruthenium. Recent studies of nitrene C–H insertion, including enantioselective C–H amination, have been developed with varying nitrene sources and transition metal catalysts.

== Examples ==
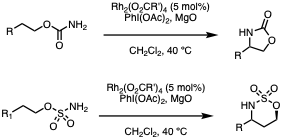
Silver-Catalyzed Intramolecular Amidation of Saturated C–H Bonds

In addition to rhodium, other transition metals have been employed in C–H amination/amidation reactions that involve a nitrene insertion. One notable example utilizes an affordable silver nitrate and t-Bu_{3}tpy ligand as catalyst to synthesize oxazolidinones and oxathiazinanes, proceeding through a silver nitrene species.

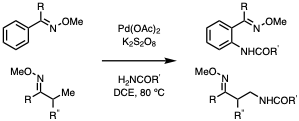
Intermolecular Amidation of Unactivated sp2 and sp3 C−H Bonds

Nitrene C−H Bond Insertion Approach to Carbazolones and Indolones

A palladium-catalyzed example with a C–H activation-nitrene insertion cascade functionalizes unactivated and primary aliphatic C–H bonds.

The use of nitrene C–H insertion in synthesis was used to generate carbazolones and indolones. These heterocyclic frameworks are important in medicinal chemistry and total synthesis.
