= Heck–Matsuda reaction =

The Heck–Matsuda (HM) reaction is an organic reaction and a type of palladium catalysed arylation of olefins that uses arenediazonium salts as an alternative to aryl halides and triflates.

The use of arenediazonium salts presents some advantages over traditional aryl halide electrophiles, for example, the use of phosphines as ligand are not required and thus negating the requirement for anaerobic conditions, which makes the reaction more practical and easier to handle. Additionally, the reaction can be performed with or without a base and is often faster than traditional Heck protocols.

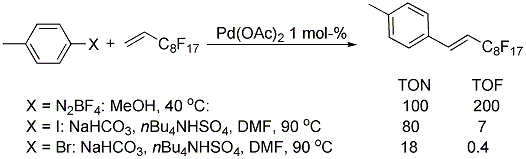
HM faster than Heck

Allylic alcohols, conjugated alkenes, unsaturated heterocycles and unactivated alkenes are capable of being arylated with arenediazonium salts using simple catalysts such as palladium acetate (Pd(OAc)_{2}) or tris(dibenzylideneacetone)dipalladium(0) (Pd_{2}dba_{3}) at room temperature in air, and in benign and conventional solvents.

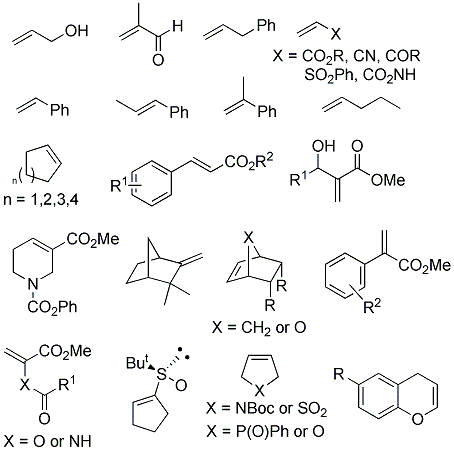
Olefins in HM reaction

In addition to the intermolecular variant of the HM reaction, intramolecular cyclization processes have also been developed for the construction of a range of oxygen and nitrogen heterocycles.

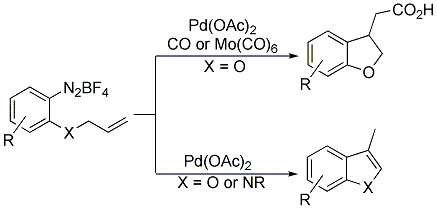
Intramolecular HM

The catalytic cycle for the Heck-Matsuda arylation reaction has four main steps: oxidative addition, migratory insertion or carbopalladation, syn β-elimination and reductive elimination. The proposed Heck catalytic cycle involving cationic palladium with diazonium salts was reinforced by studies with mass spectrometry (ESI) by Correia and co-workers. These results also show the complex interactions that occur in the coordination sphere of palladium during the Heck reaction with arenediazonium salt.

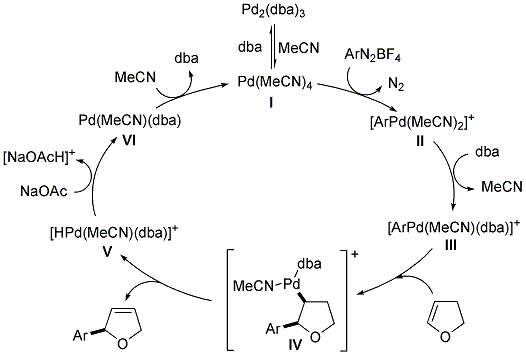
HM Mechanism

A related reaction is the Meerwein arylation that precedes the Heck reaction. Meerwein arylation often use copper salts, but may in some cases be done without a transition metal.

== See also ==
- Palladium-catalyzed coupling reactions
- Meerwein arylation
