= Westphalen–Lettré rearrangement =

Reaction in organic chemistry

The Westphalen–Lettré rearrangement is a classic organic reaction in organic chemistry describing a rearrangement reaction of cholestane-3β,5α,6β-triol diacetate with acetic anhydride and sulfuric acid. In this reaction one equivalent of water is lost, a double bond is formed at C10–C11 and importantly the methyl group at the C10 position migrates to the C5 position.

Westphalen–Lettré rearrangement

The reaction is first-order in steroid in the presence of an excess of sulfuric acid and the first reaction step in the reaction mechanism is likely the formation of a sulfate ester followed by that of a carbocation at C5 after which the actual re-arrangement takes place.
