= Schmidt reaction =

Chemical reaction between an azide and a carbonyl derivative

Named after	Karl Friedrich Schmidt
Reaction type	Rearrangement reaction

Identifiers
Organic Chemistry Portal	schmidt-reaction
RSC ontology ID	RXNO:0000170

In organic chemistry, the Schmidt reaction is an organic reaction in which an azide reacts with a carbonyl derivative, usually an aldehyde, ketone, or carboxylic acid, under acidic conditions to give an amine or amide, with expulsion of nitrogen. It is named after Karl Friedrich Schmidt (1887–1971), who first reported it in 1924 by successfully converting benzophenone and hydrazoic acid to benzanilide. The intramolecular reaction was not reported until 1991 but has become important in the synthesis of natural products. The reaction is effective with carboxylic acids to give amines (above), and with ketones to give amides (below).

== Reaction mechanism ==
=== Reaction with acids ===
The reaction is closely related to the Curtius rearrangement except that in this reaction the acyl azide is produced by reaction of the carboxylic acid with hydrazoic acid via the protonated carboxylic acid, in a process akin to a Fischer esterification. An alternative, involving the formation of an acylium ion, becomes more important when the reaction takes place in concentrated acid (>90% sulfuric acid). (In the Curtius rearrangement, sodium azide and an acyl chloride are combined to quantitatively generate the acyl azide intermediate, and the rest of the reaction takes place under neutral conditions.)

The carboxylic acid Schmidt reaction starts with acylium ion 1 obtained from protonation and loss of water. Reaction with hydrazoic acid forms the protonated azido ketone 2, which goes through a rearrangement reaction with the alkyl group R, migrating over the C-N bond with expulsion of nitrogen. The protonated isocyanate is attacked by water forming carbamate 4, which after deprotonation loses carbon dioxide to the amine.

Reaction mechanism for the amine formation from a carboxylic acid via Schmidt reaction.

=== Reaction with ketones ===
In the reaction mechanism for the Schmidt reaction of ketones, the carbonyl group is activated by protonation for nucleophilic addition by the azide, forming azidohydrin 3, which loses water in an elimination reaction to diazoiminium 5. One of the alkyl or aryl groups migrates from carbon to nitrogen with loss of nitrogen to give a nitrilium intermediate 6, as in the Beckmann rearrangement. Attack by water converts 6 to protonated imidic acid 7, which undergoes loss of proton to arrive at the imidic acid tautomer of the final amide. In an alternative mechanism, the migration occurs at 9, directly after protonation of intermediate 3, in a manner similar to the Baeyer–Villiger oxidation to give protonated amide 10. Loss of a proton again furnishes the amide. It has been proposed that the dehydration to 3 to give 5 (and, hence, the Beckmann pathway) is favored by nonaqueous acids like conc. H_{2}SO_{4}, while aqueous acids like conc. HCl favor migration from 9 (the Baeyer-Villiger pathway). These possibilities have been used to account for the fact that, for certain substrates like α-tetralone, the group that migrates can sometimes change, depending on the conditions used, to deliver either of the two possible amides.

Two proposed reaction mechanisms for the amide formation from a ketone via Schmidt reaction

== Reactions involving alkyl azides ==
The scope of this reaction has been extended to reactions of carbonyls with alkyl azides R-N_{3}. This extension was first reported by J.H. Boyer in 1955 (hence the name Boyer reaction), for example, the reaction of 3-nitrobenzaldehyde with β-azido ethanol:

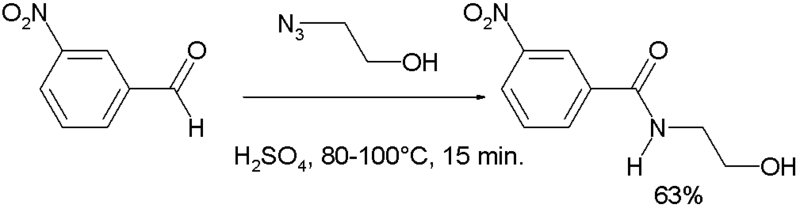
The Boyer reaction

Variations involving intramolecular Schmidt reactions have been known since 1991. These are annulation reactions and have some utility in the synthesis of natural products; such as lactams and alkaloids.

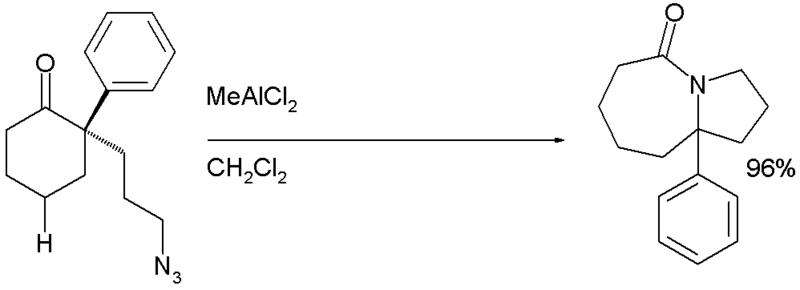
Intramolecular Schmidt reaction

== Reactions involving nitromethane (CH_{3}NO_{2}) ==
In 2020, inspired by the Nef reaction of nitro compounds, the Jiao group developed an azide-free Schmidt reaction with nitromethane as N-donor, which is recognized as the Schmidt-Jiao reaction. With Tf_{2}O as the activator, nitromethane was converted into the highly electrophilic imine species 1, which was then attacked by H_{2}O to furnish the hemiacetal intermediate 2. The C–N bond subsequently cleaved to generate intermediate 3, followed by elimination of HOTf to produce HNO. In the presence of HCO_{2}H and AcOH, reduction of HNO afforded the O-acetyl hydroxylamine 5. Finally, reaction of the starting materials with this active N-donor delivered the target product through a Beckmann-type rearrangement. Subsequently, they improved the reaction conditions, enabling nitromethane activation through the integration of a homogeneous Lewis acid and recyclable heterogeneous Brønsted acid.

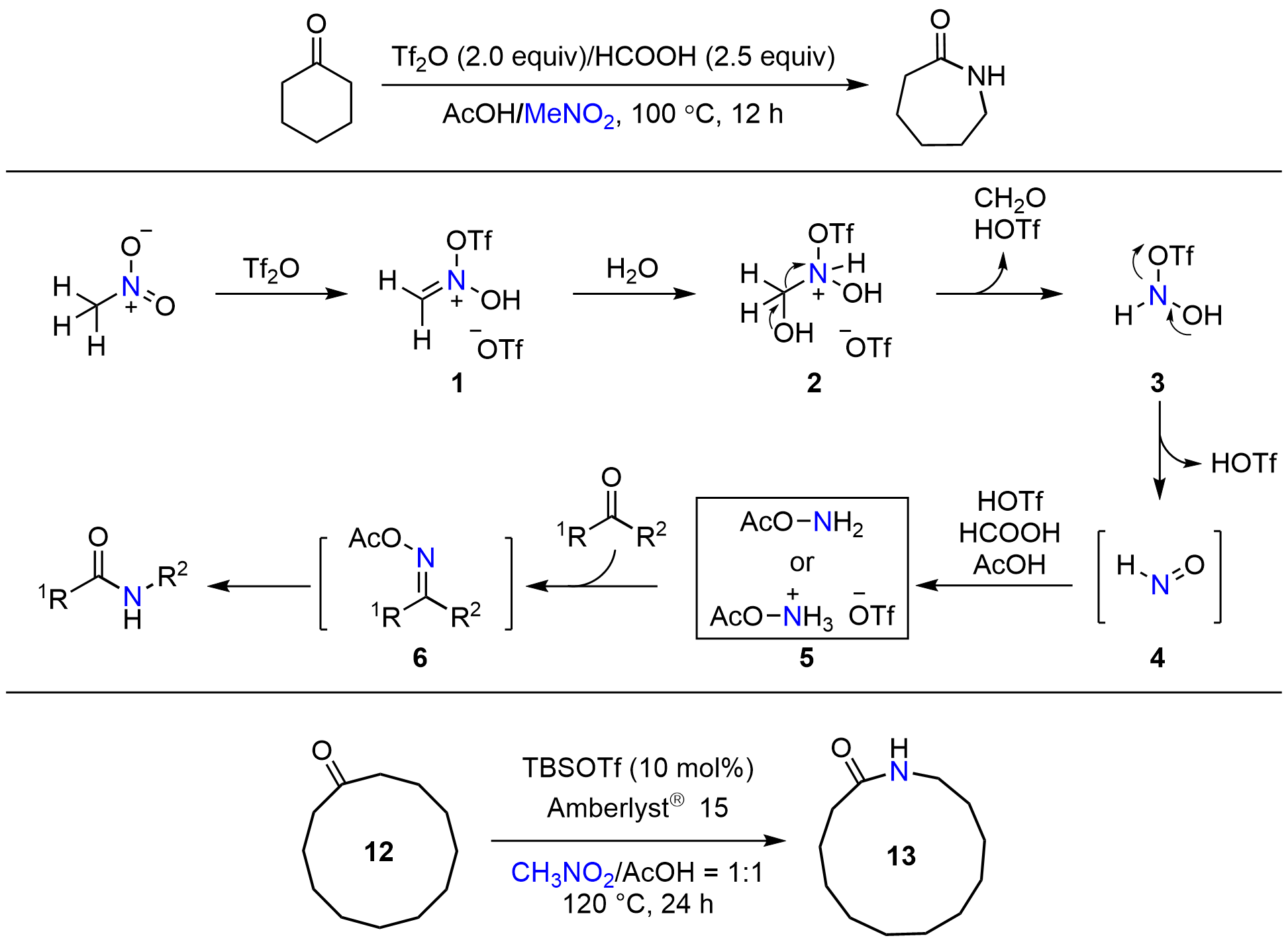
Schmidt-Jiao reaction

== See also ==
- Hofmann rearrangement
- Lossen rearrangement
