= Hans Meerwein =

German chemist (1879–1965)

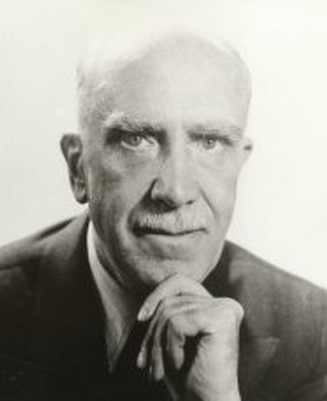
- Born: May 20, 1879; Hamburg, German Empire
- Died: October 24, 1965 (aged 86); Marburg, West Germany
- Education: University of Bonn
- Scientific career
- Fields: Organic chemistry
- Workplaces: University of Bonn, University of Königsberg, University of Marburg
- Doctoral students: Georg Wittig

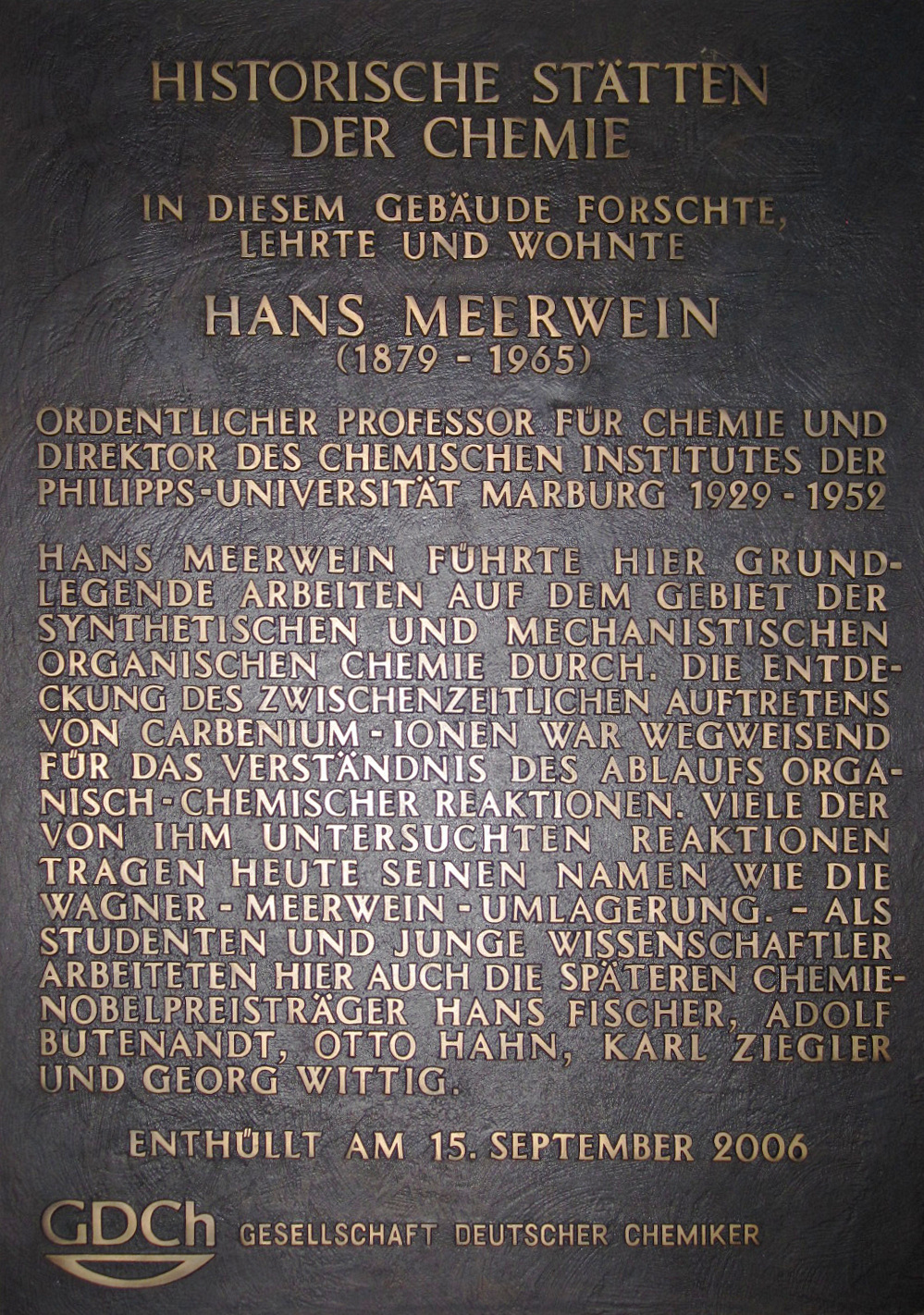
Plaque from the German Chemical Society commemorating Hans Meerwein, located at the University of Marburg

Hans Meerwein (May 20, 1879 in Hamburg, Germany – October 24, 1965 in Marburg, Germany) was a German chemist. Several reactions and reagents bear his name, most notably the Meerwein–Ponndorf–Verley reduction, the Wagner–Meerwein rearrangement, the Meerwein arylation reaction, and Meerwein's salt.

== Life and work ==
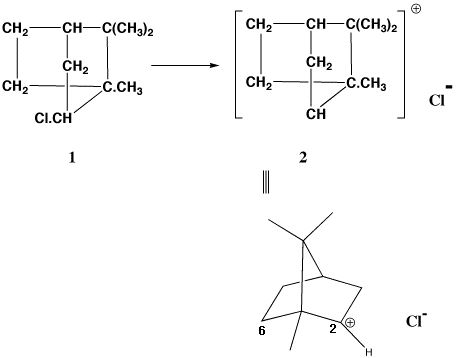
Isobornyl chloride giving a carbocation. Meerwein's representation is top, the modern view on the bottom

His father was the architect, Wilhelm Emil Meerwein. He originally trained to be a chemistry technician or 'chemotechnician' at the Fresenius University of Applied Sciences (between 1898 and 1900) before studying for a chemistry degree at the University of Bonn. After finishing his PhD with Richard Anschütz he worked at the University of Berlin, before returning to Bonn where he became professor in 1914. From 1922 till 1928 he was professor for organic chemistry at the University of Königsberg. The last change in his academic career was to the University of Marburg. The war devastated the Institute and Meerwein was planning the rebuilding which was finished in 1953, the year he retired from lecturing. He conducted experimental work with the help of two postdocs until his death in 1965.

His greatest impact upon organic chemistry was to propose the carbocation 2 as a reactive intermediate, originally as a rationalization of the racemization of isobornyl chloride 1 catalysed by a Lewis acid such as SnCl_{4}. His proposed mechanism for racemization involved a subsequent [2,6] hydride transfer, which allows the carbocation to be located at either of these two symmetric positions. An alternative mechanism—a [1,2] methyl migration, a type of reaction now known as a Wagner–Meerwein shift—was in fact suggested for the first time by Josef Houben and Pfankuch.

== Awards ==
- 1959 Otto Hahn Prize for Chemistry and Physics
