= Karl August Lossen =

German petrologist and geologist

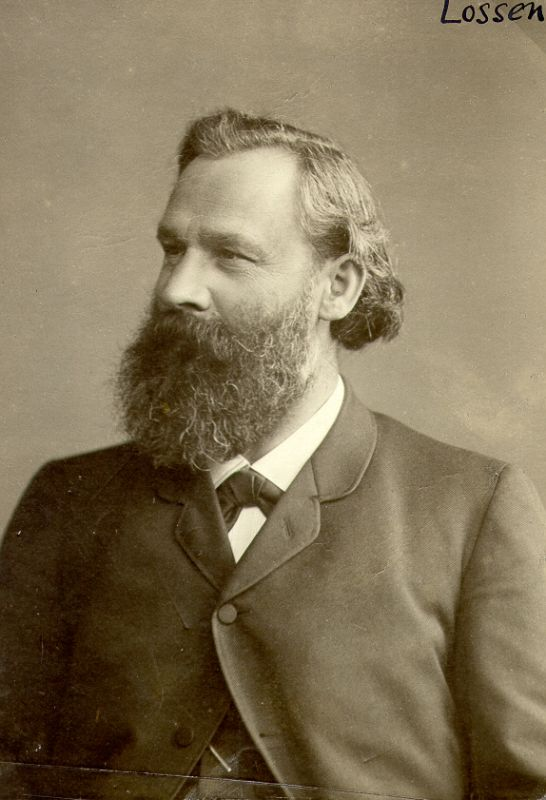
Karl August Lossen

Karl August Lossen (born Kreuznach (Rhineland), 5 January 1841; died Berlin, 24 February 1893) was a German petrologist and geologist.

After finishing his studies at the gymnasium of Kreuznach in 1859 Lossen became a mining engineer; he began by two and a half years of practical work, then studied at the Universities of Berlin and Halle, where he graduated in 1866; in the same year he became assistant geologist of the Prussian national geological survey. He began immediately his well-known petrolographic studies of the Harz Mountains, which lasted till his death. In 1870 he became instructor in petrology at the Berlin mining academy, and at the same time lecturer at the university. In 1873, he was made a member of the newly founded Prussian National Geological Institute, and in 1882 received the title of professor; he was a fellow of the Görres Society from its foundation. In 1886, he became an associate professor in the university.

He published the results of his investigation in over one hundred treatises and notices which appeared for the most part in the Zeitschrift der deutschen geologischen Gesellschaft of 1867–1891. The work of his youth, De Tauni montis parte transrhenana (Halle, 1867), appeared independently; then in 1877 followed the maps of the geological survey of the Harz Mountains and later many special maps of the Harz district, and the exhaustive work, Boden der Stadt Berlin (The Terrain of Berlin). He also wrote papers on the contact and "dynamometamorphosis" of minerals. He was considered as an authority on this subject, such that the committee in charge of the programme for the International Geological Congress in London requested him to present a paper on the origin of crystallized slate (printed in 1888). He was made a member of Belgian, French, and English learned societies. A mineral called lossenite is named after him; it is a hydrated lead-iron sulpharsenate from the mines of Laurion in Attica.

== Sources ==
Attribution

- Cites:
  - KAYSER in Neues Jahrbuch für Mineralogie, Geologie und Palaeontologie, II (Stuttgart, 1893);
  - VON HERTLING in Jahresbericht der Görresgesellschaft für 1895 (Cologne, 1896);
  - KNELLER, Das Christentum und die Vertreter der neuern Naturwissenschaft (Freiberg, 1904).
