= Lossen rearrangement =

Chemical rearrangement reaction

Named after	Wilhelm Lossen
Reaction type	Rearrangement reaction

Identifiers
RSC ontology ID	RXNO:0000156

The Lossen rearrangement is the conversion of an acyl hydroxamate to an isocyanate and carboxylic acid side product. The isocyanate can be used further to generate a urea after reaction with an amine, a carbamate after reaction with an alcohol or an amine after decarboxylation with H_{2}O.

General reaction scheme for the Lossen rearrangement.

== Reaction mechanism ==
The acyl hydroxamate is first converted to its conjugate base. A concerted rearrangement event then occurs in which the amide substituent migrates to the amide nitrogen. This displaces the carboxylic acid the nitrogen donates a pair of electrons to form the isocyanate C=N double bond, and the N–O σ-bond breaks. The rate of the rearrangement shows a strong dependence on the pK_{a} of the carboxylic acid leaving group, with electron withdrawing groups giving faster rates.

Arrow pushing mechanism for the Lossen rearrangement.

== Synthetic applications ==
In the context of organic synthesis, the Lossen rearrangement is an alternative to the Curtius, Hofmann and Schmidt rearrangements for isocyanate generation, It conveniently avoids explosive reagents (azides) and external oxidants (bromine or hypobromite).

The reaction is usually performed straight from the hydroxamic acid; the acyl hydroxamate is rarely isolated. acid chlorides and anhydrides (e.g. acetic anhydride) are the most common electrophilic activators, but alternatives include sulfonyl chlorides and CDI. CDI in particular has been demonstrated at large scale.

In principle, the isocyanate product can itself serve as an electrophilic activator for the hydroxamic acid. In practice, such a "self-propagating" Lossen rearrangement typically requires acetonitrile, as an electrophile to form an amidine intermediate; and a strong Brønsted base.

Examples, from top to bottom: Lossen rearrangement induced by acetic anhydride, induced by CDI at kilogram scale, and in a "self-propagating" reaction

== See also ==
- Curtius rearrangement, Hofmann rearrangement, and Schmidt reaction — other amide-to-isocyanate conversions
- Beckmann rearrangement — oxime rearrangement induced by acid attack at oxygen
- Glucosinolate § Enzymatic activation

== Historical references ==
- Lossen, W. (1872). "Ueber Benzoylderivate des Hydroxylamins". Justus Liebigs Annalen der Chemie. 161 (2–3): 347–362. doi:10.1002/jlac.18721610219.
- Lossen, W. (1875). "Ueber die Structurformel des Hydroxylamins und seiner amidartigen Derivate". Justus Liebigs Annalen der Chemie. 175 (3): 271–304. doi:10.1002/jlac.18751750303.
- Lossen, W. (1875). "Methode, die Carboxylgruppe aromatischer Säuren durch die Amidgruppe zu ersetzen". Justus Liebigs Annalen der Chemie. 175 (3): 313–325. doi:10.1002/jlac.18751750305.
