= Aryl radical =

An aryl radical in organic chemistry is a reactive intermediate and an arene compound incorporating one free radical carbon atom as part of the ring structure. As such it is the radical counterpart of the arenium ion. The parent compound is the phenyl radical C_{6}H^{•}_{5}. Aryl radicals are intermediates in certain organic reactions.

== Synthesis ==
Aryl radicals can be obtained via aryl diazonium salts. Alternatives for these salts are certain aryl triazenes and aryl hydrazines. Aryl bromides and iodides can be converted to aryl radicals via tributyltin hydride and related compounds and silyl hydrides. Aryl halides can also be converted via electrochemical cathodic reduction

The mushroom Stephanospora caroticolor is suspected to generate an aryl radical as part of its biological chemical defence mechanism.

== Spectroscopy ==
The parent phenyl radical has been identified by electron paramagnetic resonance and UV spectroscopy.

== Reactions ==
Aryl radicals are very reactive and are found in many different reactions. Hydrogen-atom abstraction is considered a side reaction. Several reactions of synthetic utility in which aryl radicals feature are:

- Halogen transfer
- reaction with electron-deficient alkenes in the Meerwein arylation
- biaryl couplings
- Sandmeyer reactions
- addition to iminium ions
- addition to sulfur dioxide
