= Curtius rearrangement =

Chemical reaction

Named after	Theodor Curtius
Reaction type	Rearrangement reaction

Identifiers
Organic Chemistry Portal	curtius-rearrangement
RSC ontology ID	RXNO:0000054

The Curtius rearrangement (or Curtius reaction or Curtius degradation), first defined by Theodor Curtius in 1885, is the thermal decomposition of an acyl azide to an isocyanate with loss of nitrogen gas. The isocyanate then undergoes attack by a variety of nucleophiles such as water, alcohols and amines, to yield a primary amine, carbamate or urea derivative respectively. Several reviews have been published.

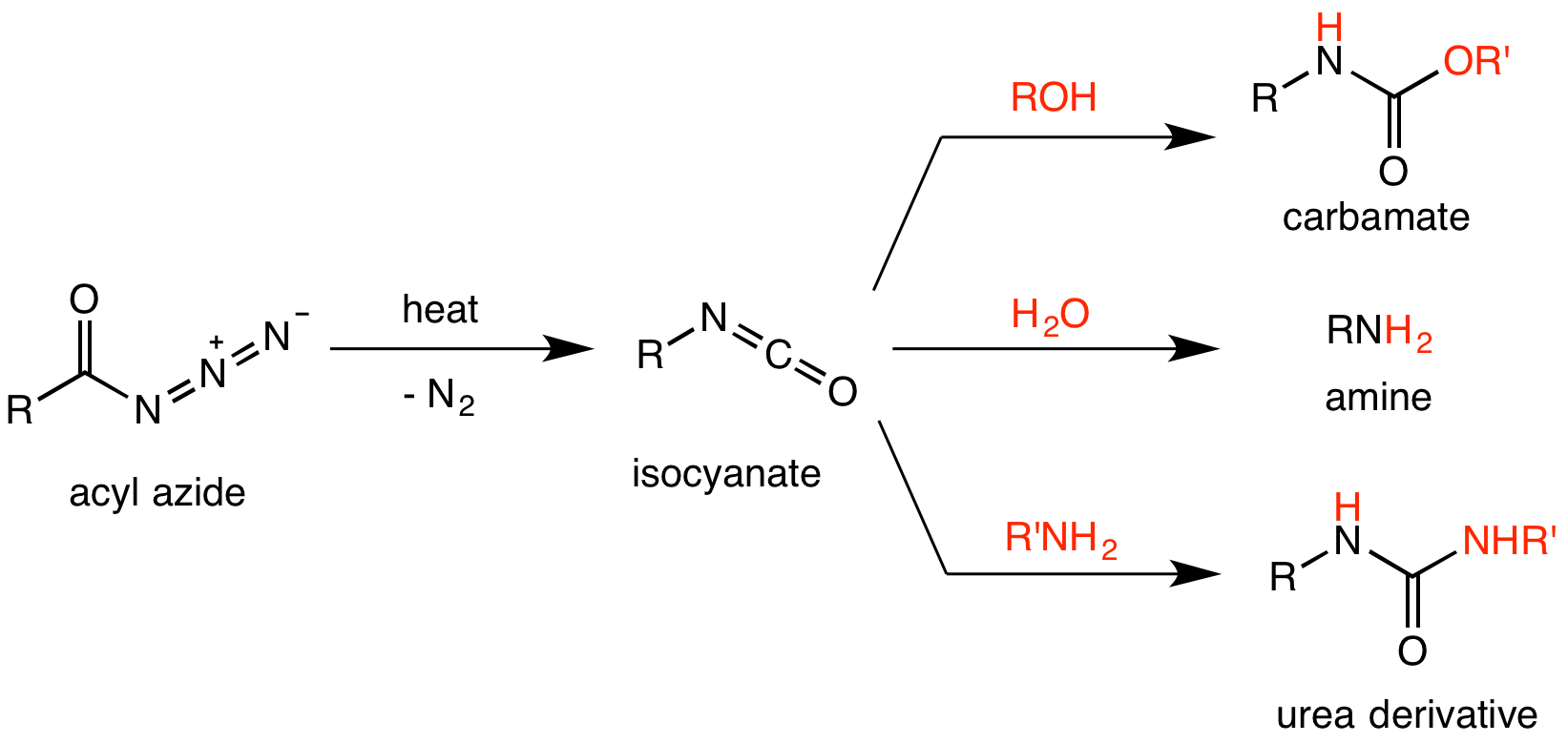
Summary scheme of the Curtius rearrangement

== Reaction mechanism ==
It was believed that the Curtius rearrangement was a two-step processes, with the loss of nitrogen gas forming an acyl nitrene, followed by migration of the R-group to give the isocyanate. However, recent research has indicated that the thermal decomposition is a concerted process, with both steps happening together, due to the absence of any nitrene insertion or addition byproducts observed or isolated in the reaction. Thermodynamic calculations also support a concerted mechanism.

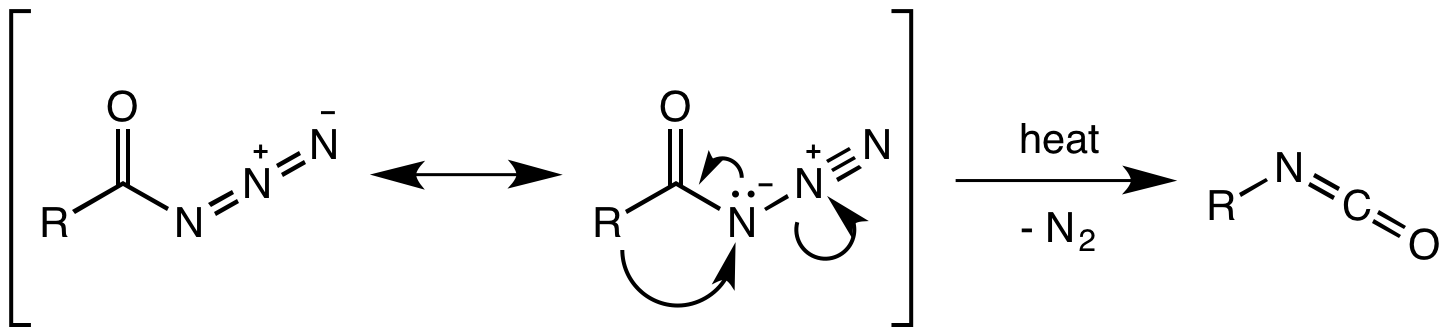
Mechanism of the Curtius rearrangement

The migration occurs with full retention of configuration at the R-group. The migratory aptitude of the R-group is roughly tertiary > secondary ~ aryl > primary. The isocyanate formed can then be hydrolyzed to give a primary amine, or undergo nucleophilic attack with alcohols and amines to form carbamates and urea derivatives respectively.

== Modifications ==
Research has shown that the Curtius rearrangement is catalyzed by both Brønsted and Lewis acids, via the protonation of, or coordination to the acyl oxygen atom respectively. For example, Fahr and Neumann have shown that the use of boron trifluoride or boron trichloride catalyst reduces the decomposition temperature needed for rearrangement by about 100 °C, and increases the yield of the isocyanate significantly.

=== Photochemical rearrangement ===
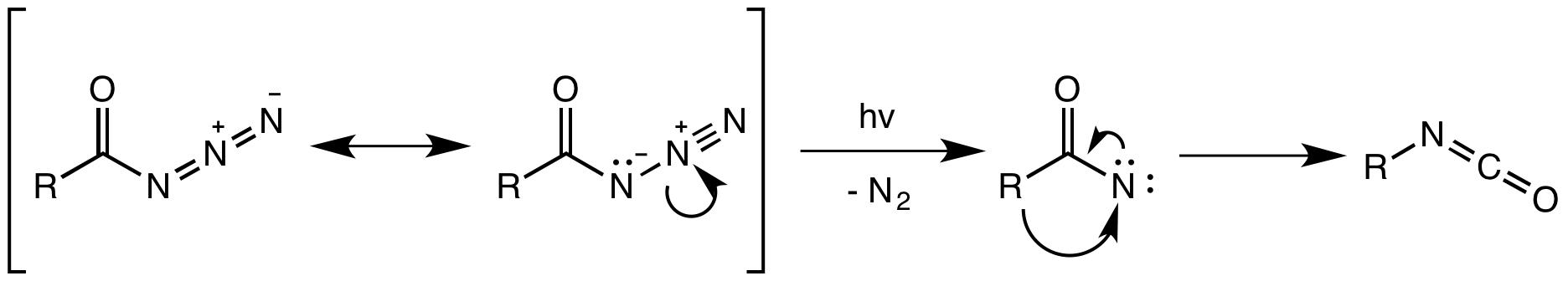
Mechanism of the photochemical Curtius rearrangement

Photochemical decomposition of the acyl azide is also possible. However, photochemical rearrangement is not concerted and instead occurs by a nitrene intermediate, formed by the cleavage of the weak N–N bond and the loss of nitrogen gas. The highly reactive nitrene can undergo a variety of nitrene reactions, such as nitrene insertion and addition, giving unwanted side products. In the example below, the nitrene intermediate inserts into one of the C–H bonds of the cyclohexane solvent to form N-cyclohexylbenzamide as a side product.

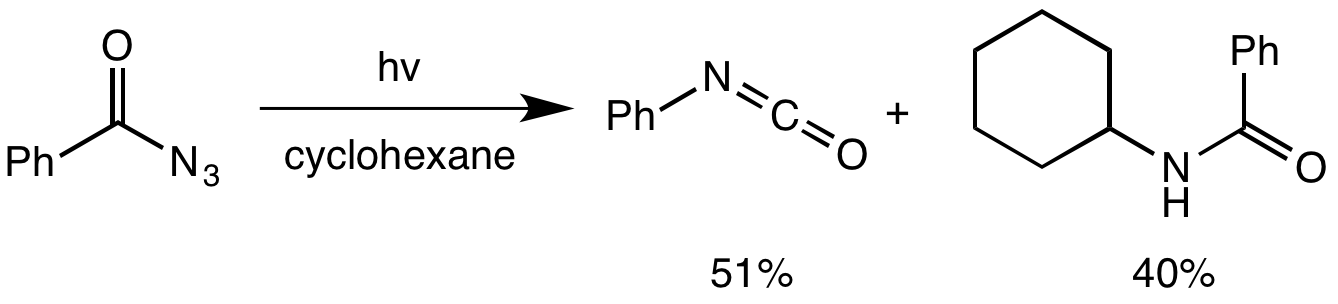
Insertion of nitrene formed by photochemical Curtius rearrangement

== Variations ==
=== Darapsky degradation ===
In one variation called the Darapsky degradation, or Darapsky synthesis, a Curtius rearrangement takes place as one of the steps in the conversion of an α-cyanoester to an amino acid. Hydrazine is used to convert the ester to an acylhydrazine, which is reacted with nitrous acid to give the acyl azide. Heating the azide in ethanol yields the ethyl carbamate via the Curtius rearrangement. Acid hydrolysis yields the amine from the carbamate and the carboxylic acid from the nitrile simultaneously, giving the product amino acid.

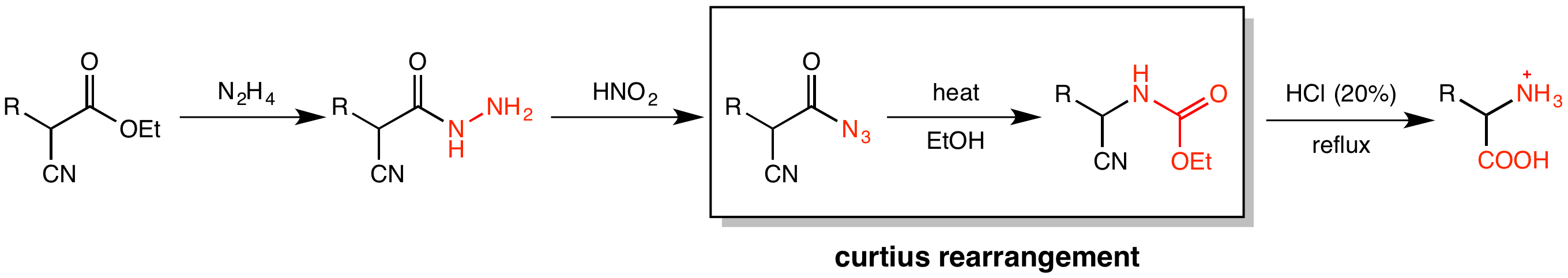
Scheme of the Darapsky amino acid synthesis

=== Harger reaction ===
The photochemical Curtius-like migration and rearrangement of a phosphinic azide forms a metaphosphonimidate in what is also known as the Harger reaction (named after Dr Martin Harger from University of Leicester). This is followed by hydrolysis, in the example below with methanol, to give a phosphonamidate.

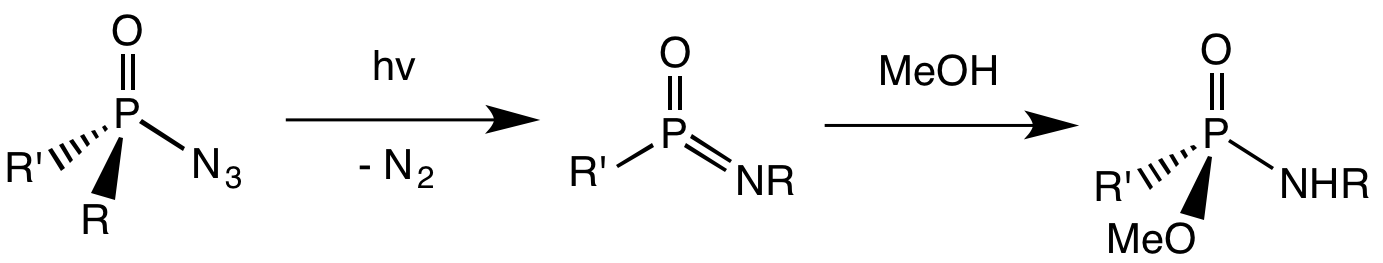
Scheme of the Harger reaction

Unlike the Curtius rearrangement, there is a choice of R-groups on the phosphinic azide which can migrate. Harger has found that the alkyl groups migrate preferentially to aryl groups, and this preference increases in the order methyl < primary < secondary < tertiary. This is probably due to steric and conformational factors, as the bulkier the R-group, the less favorable the conformation for phenyl migration.

== Synthetic applications ==
The Curtius rearrangement is tolerant of a large variety of functional groups, and has significant synthetic utility, as many different groups can be incorporated depending on the choice of nucleophile used to attack the isocyanate.

For example, when carried out in the presence of tert-butanol, the reaction generates Boc-protected amines, useful intermediates in organic synthesis. Likewise, when the Curtius reaction is performed in the presence of benzyl alcohol, Cbz-protected amines are formed.

=== Triquinacene ===
R. B. Woodward et al. used the Curtius rearrangement as one of the steps in the total synthesis of the polyquinane triquinacene in 1964. Following hydrolysis of the ester in the intermediate (1), a Curtius rearrangement was effected to convert the carboxylic acid groups in (2) to the methyl carbamate groups (3) with 84% yield. Further steps then gave triquinacene (4).

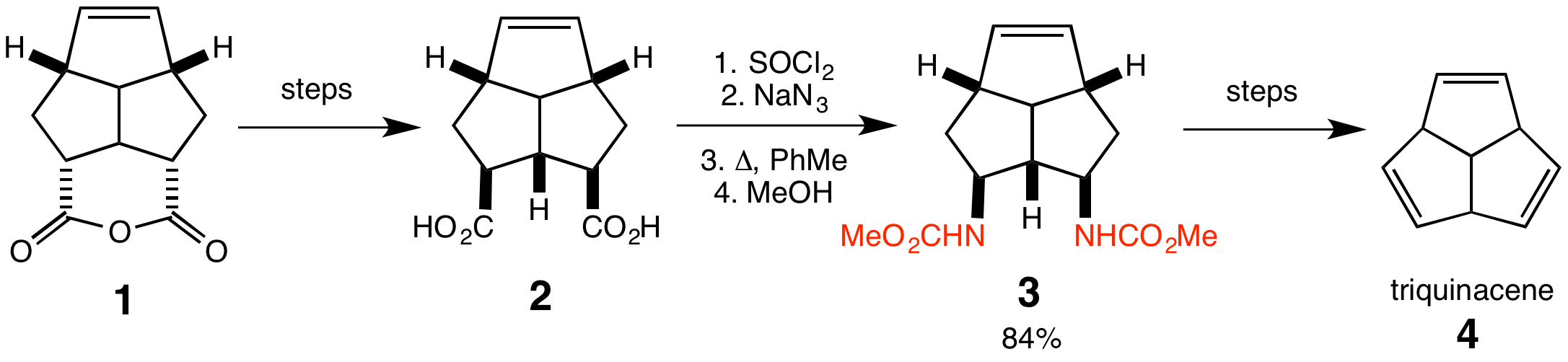
The Curtius reaction in Woodward's total synthesis of triquinacene

=== Oseltamivir ===
In their synthesis of the antiviral drug oseltamivir, also known as Tamiflu, Ishikawa et al. used the Curtius rearrangement in one of the key steps in converting the acyl azide to the amide group in the target molecule. In this case, the isocyanate formed by the rearrangement is attacked by a carboxylic acid to form the amide. Subsequent reactions could all be carried out in the same reaction vessel to give the final product with 57% overall yield. An important benefit of the Curtius reaction highlighted by the authors was that it could be carried out at room temperature, minimizing the hazard from heating. The scheme overall was highly efficient, requiring only three “one-pot” operations to produce this important and valuable drug used for the treatment of avian influenza.

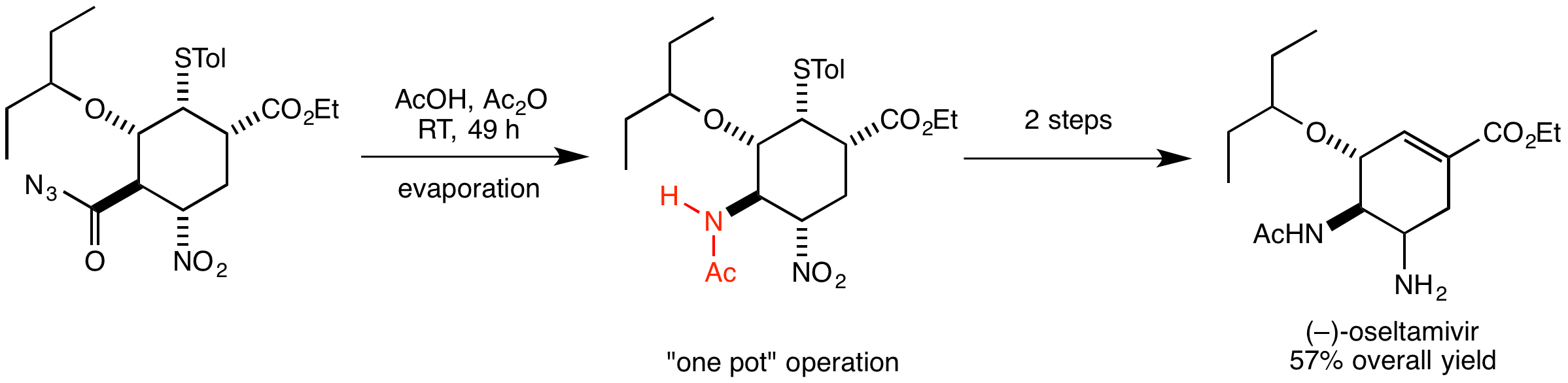
The Curtius rearrangement in the Ishikawa total synthesis of oseltamivir

=== Dievodiamine ===
Dievodiamine is a natural product from the plant Euodia ruticarpa, which is widely used in traditional Chinese medicine. Unsworth et al.’s protecting group-free total synthesis of dievodiamine utilizes the Curtius rearrangement in the first step of the synthesis, catalyzed by boron trifluoride. The activated isocyanate then quickly reacts with the indole ring in an electrophilic aromatic substitution reaction to give the amide in 94% yield, and subsequent steps give dievodamine.

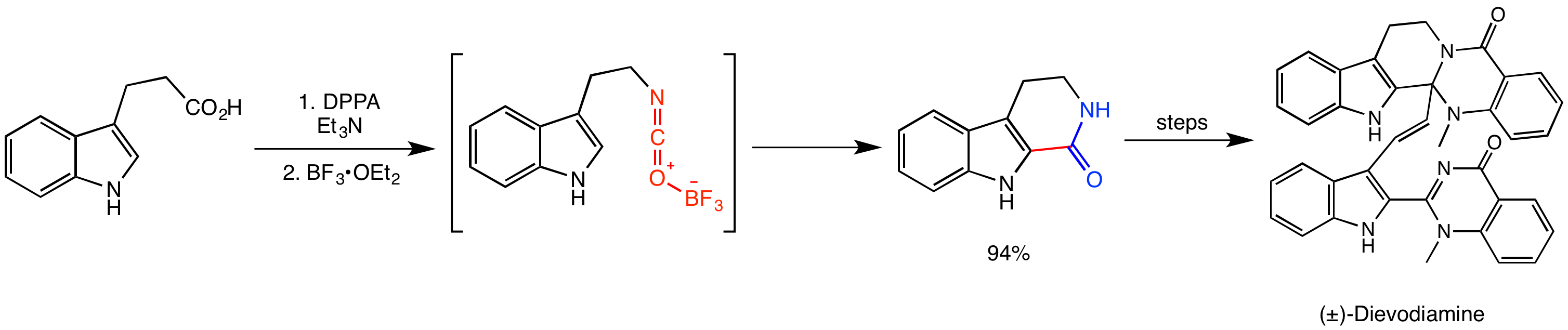
The Curtius rearrangement in the total synthesis of Dievodiamine

== See also ==
- Beckmann rearrangement
- Bergmann degradation
- Hofmann rearrangement
- Lossen rearrangement
- Schmidt reaction
- Tiemann rearrangement
- Neber rearrangement
- Wolff rearrangement
