= Halogen dance rearrangement =

Chemical reaction

The halogen dance rearrangement is an organic reaction in which a halogen substituent moves to a new position on an aromatic ring system. It was discovered through investigations on the conversion of 1,2,4-Tribromobenzene to 1,3,5-tribromobenzene catalyzed by sodium amide at -33 °C. The "reaction is seldom used" however.

The reaction proceeds by an S_{E}1 mechanism involving an aryl carbanion.

The halogen dance concept can be extended from benzene derivatives to other aromatic systems. For instance furan, thiophene, and oxazoles.

== General references ==
- Participation of oligochlorobenzenes in the base-catalyzed halogen dance Martin H. Mach, Joseph F. Bunnett; J. Org. Chem.; 1980; 45(23); 4660-4666.
