= Meerwein arylation =

Organic reaction

Named after	Hans Meerwein
Reaction type	Coupling reaction

The Meerwein arylation is an organic reaction involving the addition of an aryl diazonium salt (ArN_{2}X) to an electron-poor alkene usually supported by a metal salt. The reaction product is an alkylated arene compound. The reaction is named after Hans Meerwein, one of its inventors who first published it in 1939.

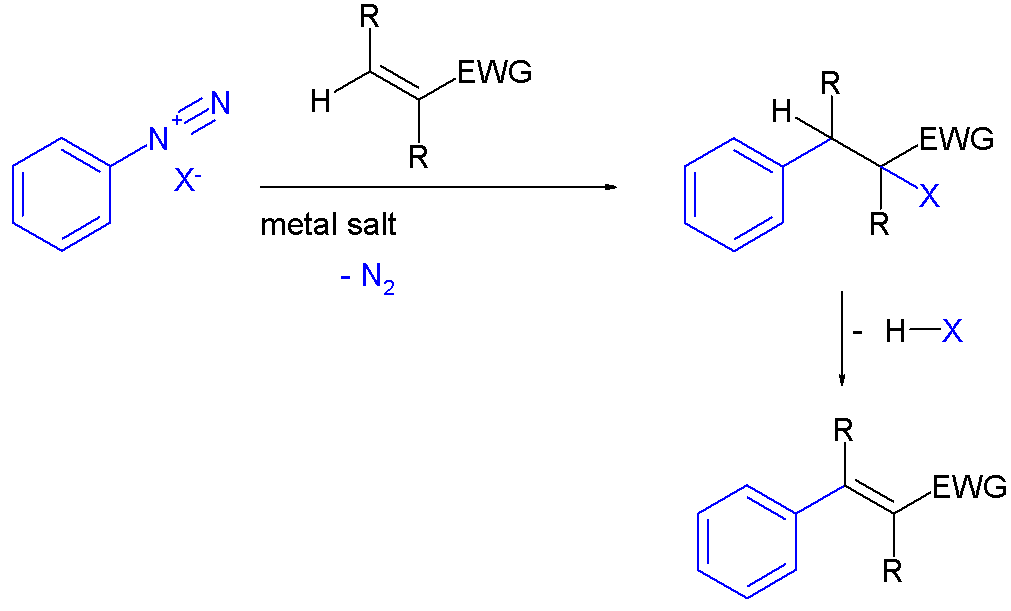
Meerwein arylation

An electron-withdrawing group (EWG) on the alkene makes it electron deficient and although the reaction mechanism is unclear, involvement of an aryl radical is presumed after loss of nitrogen in the diazonium salt followed by a free radical addition. In the primary reaction product the intermediate alkyl radical is then captured by the diazonium counterion X which is usually a halogen or a tetrafluoroborate. In a subsequent step an elimination reaction liberates HX (for instance hydrochloric acid) and an aryl vinyl compound is formed. The reaction mechanism from the arene's view ranks as a radical-nucleophilic aromatic substitution.

In a general scope a Meerwein arylation is any reaction between an aryl radical and an alkene. The initial intermediate is an aryl enthenyl radical which can react with many trapping reagents such as hydrogen or halogens or with those based on nitrogen or sulfur.

== Scope ==
A reported reaction of alkene acrylic acid with an aryl diazonium salt and copper(I) bromide and hydrobromic acid yields the α-bromocarboxylic acid. When the alkene is butadiene the initial reaction product with catalyst copper(II) chloride is a 4-chloro-2-butene and after an elimination the aryl substituted butadiene. In a so-called reductive arylation with 3-buten-2-one, titanium trichloride reduces the newly formed double bond.

In a novel kilogram-scale metal-free Meerwein arylation the diazonium salt is formed from 2-nitroaniline, the alkene isopropenyl acetate is an adduct of propyne and acetic acid and the reaction product 2-nitrophenylacetone:

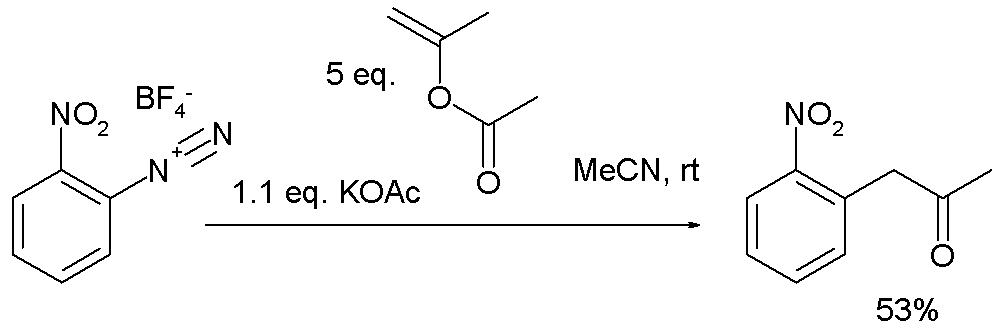
Metal free meerwein arylation

== See also ==
- Roskamp reaction – also sees substitution of a diazonium compound by a carbon centre
- Heck-Matsuda reaction – palladium catalysed version
