= Wagner–Meerwein rearrangement =

Organic reaction

A Wagner–Meerwein rearrangement is a class of carbocation 1,2-rearrangement reactions in which a hydrogen, alkyl or aryl group migrates from one carbon to a neighboring carbon. They can be described as cationic [1,2]-sigmatropic rearrangements, proceeding suprafacially and with stereochemical retention. As such, a Wagner–Meerwein shift is a thermally allowed pericyclic process with the Woodward-Hoffmann symbol [_{ω}0_{s} + _{σ}2_{s}]. They are usually facile, and in many cases, they can take place at temperatures as low as –120 °C. The reaction is named after the Russian chemist Yegor Yegorovich Vagner; he had German origin and published in German journals as Georg Wagner; and Hans Meerwein.

Several reviews have been published.

The rearrangement was first discovered in bicyclic terpenes for example the conversion of isoborneol to camphene:

Dehydration of Isoborneol to Camphene

The story of the rearrangement reveals that many scientists were puzzled with this and related reactions and its close relationship to the discovery of carbocations as intermediates.

In a simple demonstration reaction of 1,4-dimethoxybenzene with either 2-methyl-2-butanol or 3-methyl-2-butanol in sulfuric acid and acetic acid yields the same disubstituted product, the latter via a hydride shift of the cationic intermediate:

Currently, there are works relating to the use of skeletal rearrangement in the synthesis of bridged azaheterocycles. These data are summarized in

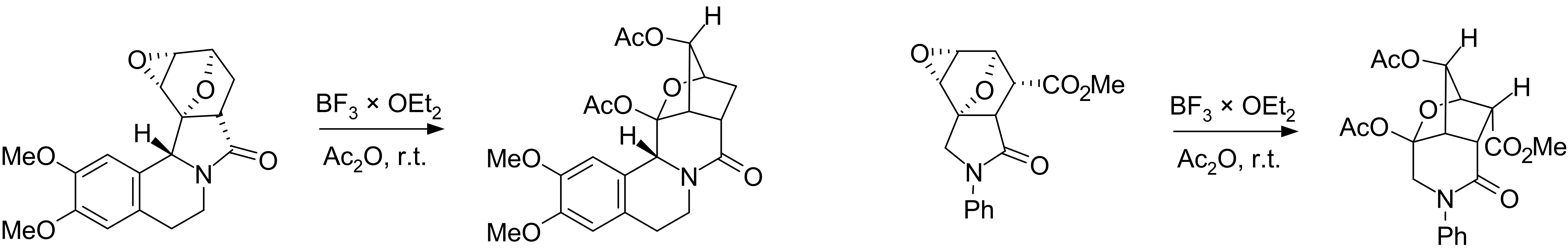

Plausible mechanisms of the Wagner–Meerwein rearrangement of diepoxyisoindoles:

The related Nametkin rearrangement, named after Sergey Namyotkin, involves the rearrangement of methyl groups in certain terpenes. In some cases the reaction type is also called a retropinacol rearrangement (see pinacol rearrangement).
