= Beckmann rearrangement =

Chemical rearrangement

Named after	Ernst Otto Beckmann
Reaction type	Rearrangement reaction

Identifiers
Organic Chemistry Portal	beckmann-rearrangement
RSC ontology ID	RXNO:0000026

The Beckmann rearrangement, named after the German chemist Ernst Otto Beckmann (1853–1923), is a rearrangement of an oxime functional group to an amide functional group. The rearrangement has also been successfully performed on haloimines and nitrones. Cyclic oximes and haloimines yield lactams.

The Beckmann rearrangement is often catalyzed by acid; however, other reagents have been known to promote the rearrangement. These include tosyl chloride, thionyl chloride, phosphorus pentachloride, phosphorus pentoxide, triethylamine, sodium hydroxide, trimethylsilyl iodide among others. The Beckmann fragmentation is another reaction that often competes with the rearrangement, though careful selection of promoting reagent and solvent conditions can favor the formation of one over the other, sometimes giving almost exclusively one product. The rearrangement occurs stereospecifically for ketoximes and N-chloro/N-fluoro imines, with the migrating group being anti-periplanar to the leaving group on the nitrogen. Certain conditions have been known to racemize the oxime geometry, leading to the formation of both regioisomers. The rearrangement of aldoximes occurs with stereospecificity in the gas phase and without stereospecificity in the solution phase. A few methodologies allow for the rearrangement of aldoximes to primary amides, but fragmentation commonly competes in these systems. Nitrone rearrangement also occurs without stereospecificity; the regioisomer formed has the amide nitrogen substituted with the group possessing the greatest migratory aptitude.

The Beckmann Rearrangement

The archetypal Beckmann rearrangement is the conversion of cyclohexanone to caprolactam via the oxime. Caprolactam is the feedstock in the production of Nylon 6.

The Beckmann solution consists of acetic acid, hydrochloric acid and acetic anhydride, and was widely used to catalyze the rearrangement. Other acids, such as sulfuric acid, polyphosphoric acid, and hydrogen fluoride have all been used. Sulfuric acid is the most commonly used acid for commercial caprolactam production due to the formation of a useful ammonium sulfate by-product when neutralized with ammonia water.

== Reaction mechanism ==
The most common reaction mechanism of the Beckmann rearrangement consists generally of an alkyl migration anti-periplanar to the expulsion of a leaving group to form a nitrilium ion. This is followed by solvolysis to an imidate and then tautomerization to the amide:

Beckmann rearrangement mechanism

This nitrilium ion has been known to be intercepted by other nucleophiles, including the leaving group from the oxime.

Beckmann rearrangement undesired products

Presumably after the phenyl group migrates and expels the cyanate, the latter then attacks the nitrilium ion formed. In carbon tetrachloride the isocyanate can be isolated, whereas in ethanol, the urethane is formed after solvolysis of the isocyanate.

One computational study has established the mechanism accounting for solvent molecules and substituents. The rearrangement of acetone oxime in the Beckmann solution involved three acetic acid molecules and one proton (present as an oxonium ion). In the transition state leading to the iminium ion (σ-complex), the methyl group migrates to the nitrogen atom in a concerted reaction as the hydroxyl group is expelled. The oxygen atom in the hydroxyl group is stabilized by three acetic acid molecules. In the next step the electrophilic carbon atom in the nitrilium ion is attacked by water and a proton is donated back to acetic acid. In the transition state leading to the imidate, the water oxygen atom is coordinated to 4 other atoms. In the third step, an isomerization step protonates the nitrogen atom leading to the amide.

The Beckmann rearrangement mechanism

The same computation with a hydroxonium ion and 6 molecules of water has the same result, but when the migrating substituent is a phenyl group, the mechanism favors the formation of an intermediate three-membered π-complex. This π-complex is not found in the H_{3}O^{+}(H_{2}O)_{6}.

The Beckmann rearrangement scheme for acetophenone oxime under oxonium–acetic acid complex and hydronium–water complex.

With the cyclohexanone-oxime, the relief of ring strain results in a third reaction mechanism, leading directly to the protonated caprolactam in a single concerted step without the intermediate formation of a π-complex or σ-complex.

== Cyanuric chloride assisted Beckmann reaction ==
Beckmann rearrangement can be rendered catalytic using cyanuric chloride and zinc chloride as a co-catalyst. For example, cyclododecanone can be converted to the corresponding lactam, the monomer used in the production of Nylon 12.

Beckmann reaction

The reaction mechanism for this reaction is based on a catalytic cycle with cyanuric chloride activating the hydroxyl group via a nucleophilic aromatic substitution. The reaction product is dislodged and replaced by new reactant via an intermediate Meisenheimer complex.

Beckmann cyanuric acid cataly cycle

== Beckmann fragmentation ==
The Beckmann fragmentation is a reaction that frequently competes with the Beckmann rearrangement. When the group α to the oxime is capable of stabilizing carbocation formation, the fragmentation becomes a viable reaction pathway. The reaction generates a nitrile and a carbocation, which is quickly intercepted to form a variety of products. The nitrile can also be hydrolyzed under reaction conditions to give carboxylic acids. Different reaction conditions can favor the fragmentation over the rearrangement.

Quaternary carbon centers promote fragmentation by stabilizing carbocation formation through hyperconjugation. As shown in the above picture, the "stable" carbocation is formed, which then loses a hydrogen to give a site of unsaturation. Oxygen and nitrogen atoms also promote fragmentation through the formation of ketones and imines respectively.

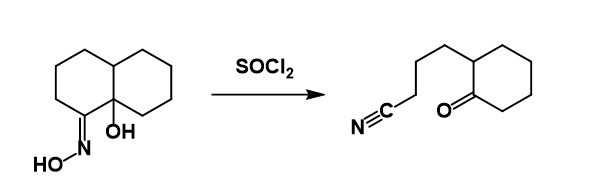
Oxygen Stabilized Fragmentation

Sulfur is also capable of promoting fragmentation, albeit at a longer range than oxygen or nitrogen.

Reaction mechanism for sulfur-stabilized Beckmann fragmentation.

Silicon is capable of directing the fragmentation through the beta-silicon effect.

The carbocation intermediate in this reaction is intercepted by nucleophilic fluoride from diethylaminosulfur trifluoride (DAST):

== Semmler–Wolff reaction ==
The oxime of cyclohexenone with acid forms aniline in a dehydration – aromatization reaction called the Semmler–Wolff reaction or Wolff aromatization

Semmler–Wolff reaction

The mechanism can be shown as below:

The reaction is intrinsically a special case of the Beckmann rearrangement combined with neighbouring group participation.

== Applications in drug synthesis ==
An industrial synthesis of paracetamol developed by Hoechst–Celanese involves the acid-catalyzed Beckmann rearrangement of piceol oxime:

== See also ==
- Curtius rearrangement
- Dakin reaction
- Schmidt reaction
- Stieglitz rearrangement
- Lossen rearrangement
- Baeyer-Villiger rearrangement
