= Rearrangement reaction =

Chemical reaction where a molecule is turned into a structural isomer of itself

In organic chemistry, a rearrangement reaction is a broad class of organic reactions "that involves a change of connectivity". Usually the term rearrangement refers to intramolecular processes involving modification of carbon skeleton. Often a substituent moves from one atom to another atom in the same molecule, hence these reactions are usually intramolecular. In the example below, the substituent R moves from carbon atom 1 to carbon atom 2:

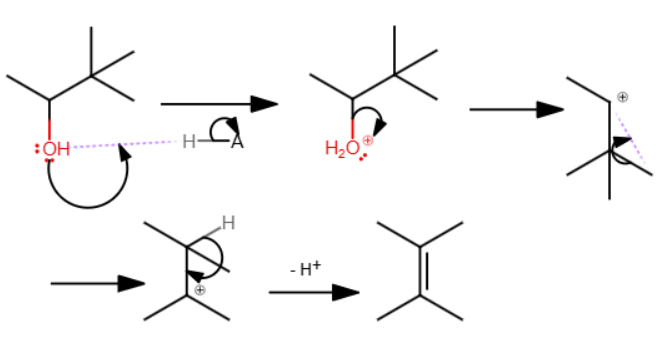
1,2 alkyl shift, the shifting of an alkyl group in the 1,2-rearragement, in a dehydration of an alcohol (E1 elimination)

$${-}\underset{| \atop \displaystyle \color{Blue}\ce{R}}\ce{C}\ce{-C-C{-} -> {-C-}}\underset{| \atop \displaystyle \color{Blue}\ce{R}}\ce{C}\ce{-C}{-}$$

A rearrangement is not well represented by simple and discrete electron transfers (represented by curved arrows in organic chemistry texts). The actual mechanism of alkyl groups moving, as in Wagner–Meerwein rearrangement, probably involves transfer of the moving alkyl group fluidly along a bond, not ionic bond-breaking and forming. In pericyclic reactions, explanation by orbital interactions give a better picture than simple discrete electron transfers. It is, nevertheless, possible to draw the curved arrows for a sequence of discrete electron transfers that give the same result as a rearrangement reaction, although these are not necessarily realistic. In allylic rearrangement, the reaction is indeed ionic.

== 1,2-rearrangements ==
A 1,2-rearrangement is an organic reaction where a substituent moves from one atom to another atom in a chemical compound. In a 1,2 shift the movement involves two adjacent atoms but moves over larger distances are possible. Skeletal isomerization is not normally encountered in the laboratory, but is the basis of large applications in oil refineries. In general, straight-chain alkanes are converted to branched isomers by heating in the presence of a catalyst. Examples include isomerisation of n-butane to isobutane and pentane to isopentane. Highly branched alkanes have favorable combustion characteristics for internal combustion engines.

Further examples are the Wagner–Meerwein rearrangement:

and the Beckmann rearrangement, which is relevant to the production of certain nylons:

== Pericyclic reactions ==
A pericyclic reaction is a type of reaction with multiple carbon–carbon bond making and breaking wherein the transition state of the molecule has a cyclic geometry, and the reaction progresses in a concerted fashion. Examples are hydride shifts

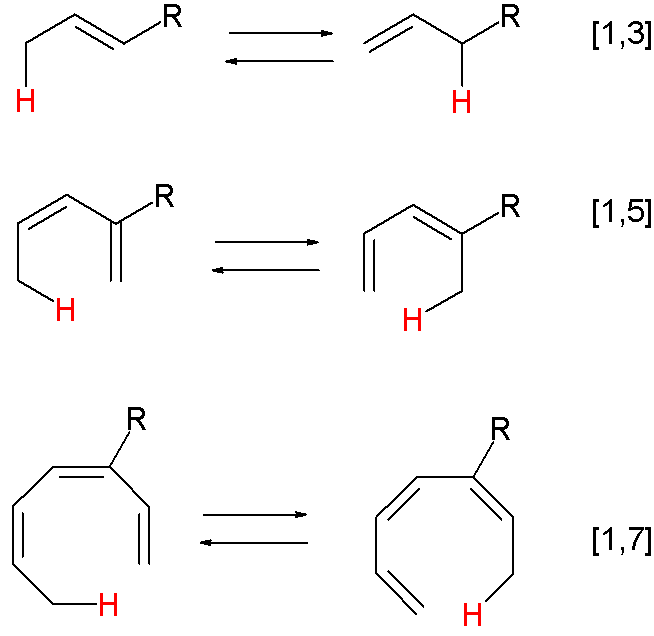

and the Claisen rearrangement:

== Other rearrangement reactions ==
=== 1,3-rearrangements ===
1,3-rearrangements take place over 3 carbon atoms. Examples:

- the Fries rearrangement
- a 1,3-alkyl shift of verbenone to chrysanthenone

== See also ==
- Amadori rearrangement
- Curtius rearrangement
- Hofmann rearrangement
- Lossen rearrangement
- Mumm rearrangement
- Photochemical rearrangement
- Pinacol rearrangement
- Schmidt reaction
- Thermal rearrangement of aromatic hydrocarbons
- Tiemann rearrangement
- Wolff rearrangement
