= Nitrene =

Nitrogen-based molecule

The generic structure of a nitrene group

In chemistry, a nitrene or imene (R−:Ṅ·) is the nitrogen analogue of a carbene. The nitrogen atom is uncharged and monovalent, so it has only 6 electrons in its valence level—two covalent bonded and four non-bonded electrons. It is therefore considered an electrophile due to the unsatisfied octet. A nitrene is a reactive intermediate and is involved in many chemical reactions. The simplest nitrene, HN, is called imidogen, and that term is sometimes used as a synonym for the nitrene class.

== Electron configuration ==
In the simplest case, the linear N–H molecule (imidogen) has its nitrogen atom sp hybridized, with two of its four non-bonded electrons as a lone pair in an sp orbital and the other two occupying a degenerate pair of p orbitals. The electron configuration is consistent with Hund's rule: the low energy form is a triplet with one electron in each of the p orbitals and the high energy form is the singlet with an electron pair filling one p orbital and the other p orbital vacant.

As with carbenes, a strong correlation exists between the spin density on the nitrogen atom which can be calculated in silico and the zero-field splitting parameter D which can be derived experimentally from electron spin resonance. Small nitrenes such as NH or CF_{3}N have D values around 1.8 cm^{−1} with spin densities close to a maximum value of 2. At the lower end of the scale are molecules with low D (< 0.4) values and spin density of 1.2 to 1.4 such as 9-anthrylnitrene and 9-phenanthrylnitrene.

== Formation ==
Because nitrenes are so reactive, they are rarely isolated. Instead, they are formed as reactive intermediates during a reaction. There are two common ways to generate nitrenes:

- From azides by thermolysis or photolysis, with expulsion of nitrogen gas. This method is analogous to the formation of carbenes from diazo compounds.
- From isocyanates, with expulsion of carbon monoxide. This method is analogous to the formation of carbenes from ketenes.

Since formation of the nitrene typically starts from a diamagnetic precursor, the direct chemical product is a singlet nitrene, which then relaxes to its ground state triplet state. As has been shown for phenylazide as a model system, the direct photoproduct of photochemical-induced N_{2} loss can either be the singlet or triplet nitrene. By using a triplet sensitizer, the triplet nitrene can also be formed without initial formation of the singlet nitrene.

== Isolated nitrenes ==
Although highly reactive, some nitrenes could be isolated and characterized recently.

In 2019, a triplet nitrene was isolated by Betley and Lancaster, stabilized by coordination to a copper center in a bulky ligand. Terminal singlet nitrenes have been isolated for palladium in 2022 and cobalt in 2023; a rhodium nitrene has been characterized in crystallo. Also Pd and Pt triplet metallonitrenes, where the organic residue is replaced by a metal, have been characterized. In 2024, the groups of Beckmann, Ye and Tan reported the isolation and characterization of organic triplet nitrenes, which are protected from chemical reactivity by an extremely bulky ligand.

== Reactions ==
Nitrene reactions include:

- Nitrene C–H insertion. A nitrene can easily insert into a carbon to hydrogen covalent bond yielding an amine or amide. A singlet nitrene reacts with retention of configuration. In one study a nitrene, formed by oxidation of a carbamate with potassium persulfate, gives an insertion reaction into the palladium to nitrogen bond of the reaction product of palladium(II) acetate with 2-phenylpyridine to methyl N-(2-pyridylphenyl)carbamate in a cascade reaction:

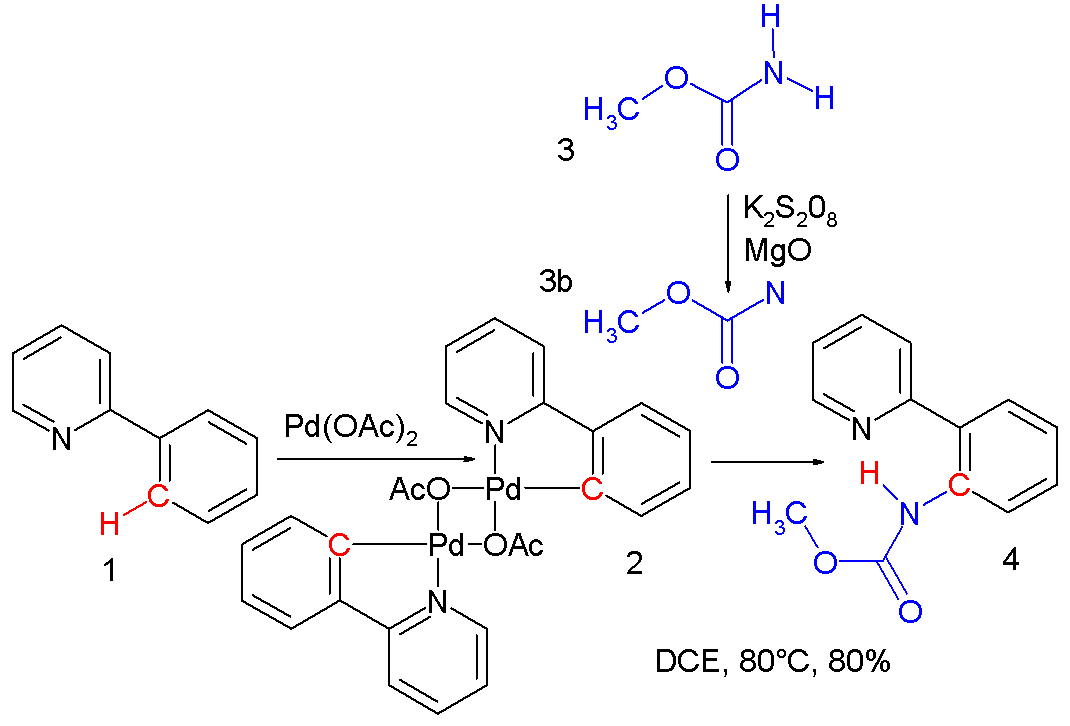

A nitrene intermediate is suspected in this C–H insertion involving an oxime, acetic anhydride leading to an isoindole:

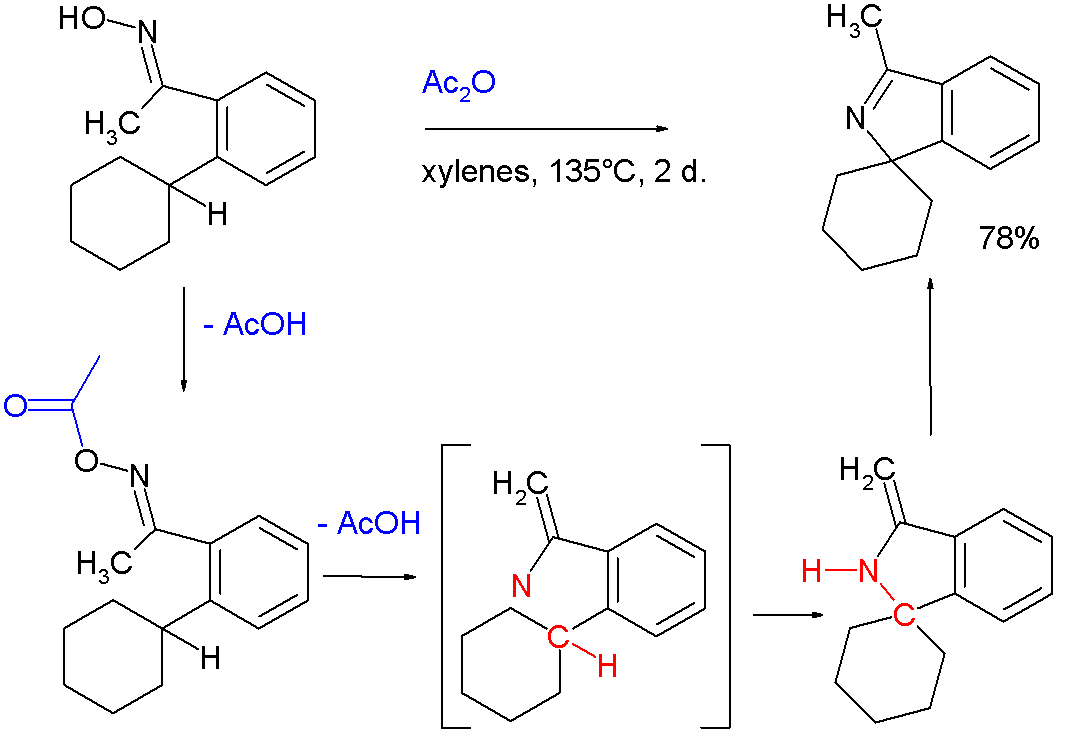

- Nitrene cycloaddition. With alkenes, nitrenes react to form aziridines, very often with nitrenoid precursors such as nosyl- or tosyl-substituted [N-(phenylsulfonyl)imino]phenyliodinane (PhI=NNs or PhI=NTs respectively)) but the reaction is known to work directly with the sulfonamide in presence of a transition metal based catalyst such as copper, palladium, or gold:

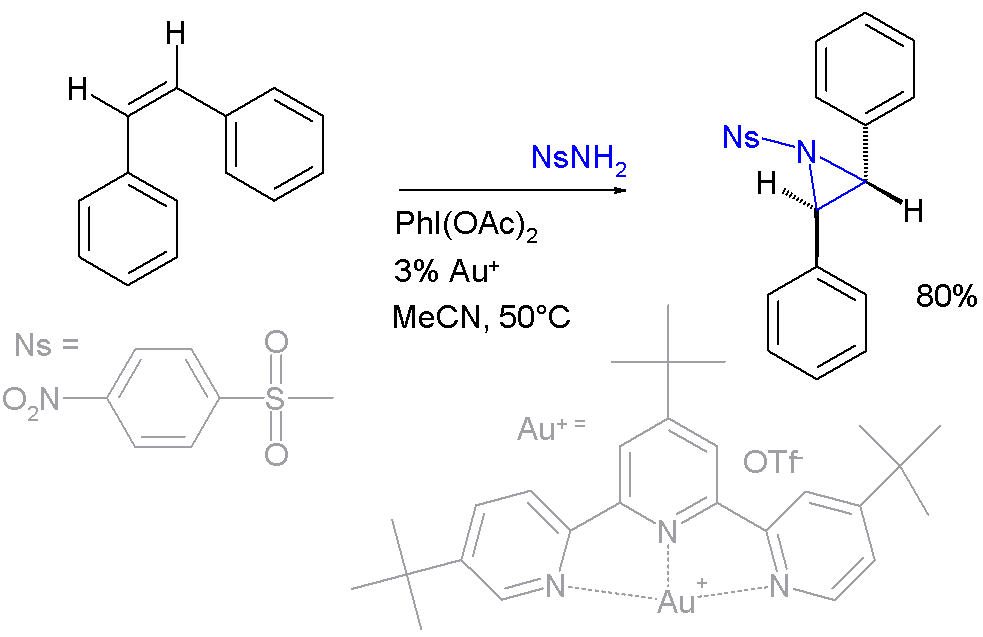

In most cases, however, [N-(p-nitrophenylsulfonyl)imino]phenyliodinane (PhI=NNs) is prepared separately as follows:

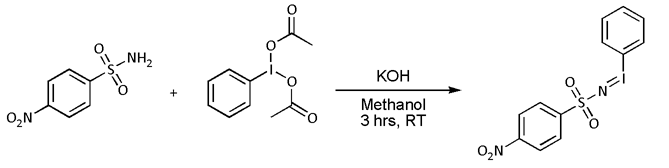

Nitrene transfer takes place next:

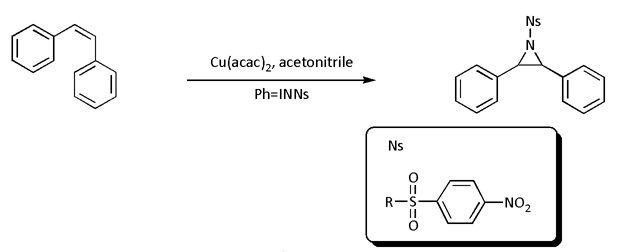

In this particular reaction both the cis-stilbene illustrated and the trans form (not depicted) result in the same trans-aziridine product, suggesting a two-step reaction mechanism. The energy difference between triplet and singlet nitrenes can be very small in some cases, allowing interconversion at room temperature. Triplet nitrenes are thermodynamically more stable but react stepwise allowing free rotation and thus producing a mixture of stereochemistry.

- Arylnitrene ring-expansion and ring-contraction: Aryl nitrenes show ring expansion to 7-membered ring cumulenes, ring opening reactions and nitrile formations many times in complex reaction paths. For instance the azide 2 in the scheme below trapped in an argon matrix at 20 K on photolysis expels nitrogen to the triplet nitrene 4 (observed experimentally with ESR and ultraviolet-visible spectroscopy) which is in equilibrium with the ring-expansion product 6.

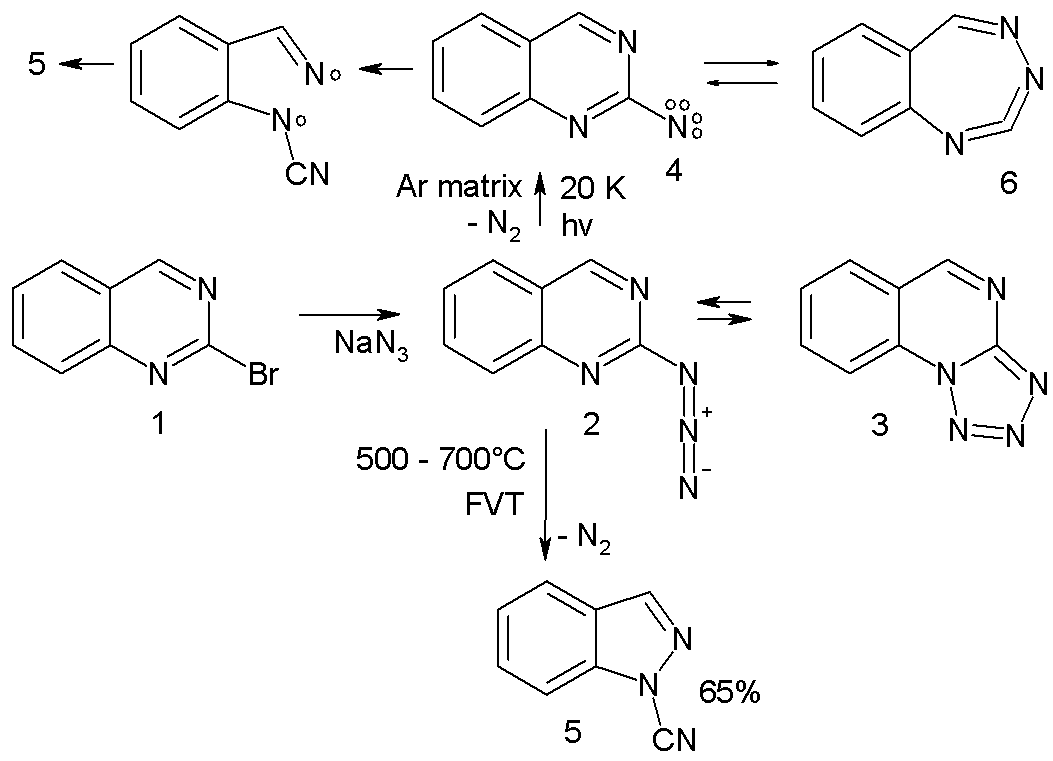

The nitrene ultimately converts to the ring-opened nitrile 5 through the diradical intermediate 7. In a high-temperature reaction, FVT at 500–600 °C also yields the nitrile 5 in 65% yield. Arylnitrene internalization in combination with carbon deletion strategies have been used for aromatic carbon-nitrogen swap to generate pyridines from phenyl azides.

== Nitreno radicals ==
For several compounds containing both a nitrene group and a free radical group an ESR high-spin quartet has been recorded (matrix, cryogenic temperatures). One of these has an amine oxide radical group incorporated, another system has a carbon radical group.

In this system one of the nitrogen unpaired electrons is delocalized in the aromatic ring making the compound a σ–σ–π triradical. A carbene nitrogen radical (imidyl radical) resonance structure makes a contribution to the total electronic picture.
