= List of organic reactions =

Well-known reactions and reagents in organic chemistry include:

== 0-9 ==
- 1,2-Wittig rearrangement
- 1,3-Dipolar cycloaddition
- 2,3-Wittig rearrangement

== A ==
- Abidi alkyne synthesis
- Acetalisation
- Acetoacetic ester condensation
- Achmatowicz reaction
- Acylation
- Acyloin condensation
- Adams' catalyst
- Adams decarboxylation
- Adkins catalyst
- Adkins–Peterson reaction
- Akabori amino acid reaction
- Alcohol oxidation
- Alder ene reaction
- Alder–Stein rules
- Aldol addition
- Aldol condensation
- Algar–Flynn–Oyamada reaction
- Alkylimino-de-oxo-bisubstitution
- Alkyne trimerisation
- Alkyne zipper reaction
- Allan–Robinson reaction
- Allylic rearrangement
- Amadori rearrangement
- Amine alkylation
- Angeli–Rimini reaction
- Andrussov oxidation
- Appel reaction
- Arbuzov reaction, Arbusow reaction
- Arens–Van Dorp synthesis, Isler modification
- Aromatic nitration
- Arndt–Eistert synthesis
- Aston–Greenburg rearrangement
- Auwers synthesis
- Aza-Cope rearrangement
- Azo coupling

== B ==
- Baeyer–Drewsen indigo synthesis (also commonly incorrectly named Baeyer–Drewson indigo synthesis)
- Baeyer–Villiger oxidation, Baeyer–Villiger rearrangement
- Bakeland process (Bakelite)
- Baker–Venkataraman rearrangement, Baker–Venkataraman transformation
- Baldwin's rules
- Bally–Scholl synthesis
- Balz–Schiemann reaction
- Bamberger rearrangement
- Bamberger triazine synthesis
- Bamford–Stevens reaction
- Barbier reaction
- Barbier–Wieland degradation
- Bardhan–Sengupta phenanthrene synthesis
- Barfoed's test
- Bargellini reaction
- Bartoli indole synthesis, Bartoli reaction
- Barton decarboxylation
- Barton reaction
- Barton–Kellogg reaction
- Barton–McCombie reaction, Barton deoxygenation
- Barton-Zard Synthesis
- Barton vinyl iodine procedure
- Baudisch reaction
- Bayer test
- Baylis–Hillman reaction
- Bechamp reaction
- Bechamp reduction
- Beckmann fragmentation
- Beckmann rearrangement
- Bellus–Claisen rearrangement
- Belousov–Zhabotinsky reaction
- Benary reaction
- Benedict's reagent
- Benkeser reaction
- Benzidine rearrangement
- Benzilic acid rearrangement
- Benzoin condensation
- Bergman cyclization
- Bergmann azlactone peptide synthesis
- Bergmann degradation
- Bergmann–Zervas carbobenzoxy method
- Bernthsen acridine synthesis
- Bestmann's reagent
- Betti reaction
- Biginelli pyrimidine synthesis
- Biginelli reaction
- Bingel reaction
- Birch reduction
- Bischler–Möhlau indole synthesis
- Bischler–Napieralski reaction
- Biuret test
- Blaise ketone synthesis
- Blaise reaction
- Blanc reaction
- Blanc chloromethylation
- Blum–Ittah aziridine synthesis
- Bodroux reaction
- Bodroux–Chichibabin aldehyde synthesis
- Bogert–Cook synthesis
- Bohlmann-Rahtz pyridine synthesis
- Bohn–Schmidt reaction
- Boord olefin synthesis
- Borodin reaction
- Borsche–Drechsel cyclization
- Bosch–Meiser urea process
- Bosch reaction
- Bouveault aldehyde synthesis
- Bouveault–Blanc reduction
- Boyland–Sims oxidation
- Boyer Reaction
- Bredt's rule
- Brook rearrangement
- Brown hydroboration
- Bucherer carbazole synthesis
- Bucherer reaction
- Bucherer–Bergs reaction
- Buchner ring enlargement
- Büchner–Curtius–Schlotterbeck reaction
- Buchwald–Hartwig amination
- Bunnett reaction
- Burgess reagent

== C ==
- Cadiot–Chodkiewicz coupling
- Cadogan-Sundberg indole synthesis
- Camps quinoline synthesis
- Cannizzaro reaction
- Carbohydrate acetalisation
- Carbonyl reduction
- Carbonylation
- Carbylamine reaction
- Carroll reaction
- Castro–Stephens coupling
- Catalytic reforming
- Catellani Reaction
- Corey–Itsuno reduction (AKA Corey–Bakshi–Shibata reduction or CBS reduction)
- Chan–Lam coupling
- Chapman rearrangement
- Cheletropic reaction
- Chichibabin pyridine synthesis
- Chichibabin reaction
- Chiral pool synthesis
- Chugaev elimination (also transliterated as Tschugajeff reaction)
- Ciamician–Dennstedt rearrangement
- Claisen condensation
- Claisen rearrangement
- Claisen–Schmidt condensation
- Clemmensen reduction
- Collins reagent
- Combes quinoline synthesis
- Conia reaction
- Conrad–Limpach synthesis
- Cook–Heilbron thiazole synthesis
- Cope elimination
- Cope rearrangement
- Corey reagent
- Corey–Fuchs reaction
- Corey–Gilman–Ganem oxidation
- Corey–Kim oxidation
- Corey-Nicolaou macrolactonization
- Corey–Posner, Whitesides–House reaction
- Corey-Seebach reaction
- Corey–Winter olefin synthesis
- Corey–Winter reaction
- Cornforth rearrangement
- Coupling reaction
- Crabbé reaction
- Craig method
- Cram's rule of asymmetric induction
- Creighton process
- Criegee reaction
- Criegee rearrangement
- Cross metathesis
- Crum Brown–Gibson rule
- Curtius degradation
- Curtius rearrangement, Curtius reaction
- Cyanohydrin reaction

== D ==
- Dakin reaction (AKA Dakin oxidation)
- Dakin–West reaction
- Danheiser annulation
- Danheiser benzannulation
- Darapsky degradation
- Darzens condensation, Darzens–Claisen reaction, Glycidic ester condensation
- Darzens halogenation
- Darzens synthesis of unsaturated ketones
- Darzens tetralin synthesis
- Davis' reagent, Davis oxidation
- Davis–Beirut reaction
- De Kimpe aziridine synthesis
- Dehydration reaction
- Dehydrogenation
- Delépine reaction
- DeMayo reaction
- Demjanov rearrangement
- Demjanow desamination
- Dess–Martin oxidation
- Diazoalkane 1,3-dipolar cycloaddition
- Diazotisation
- DIBAL-H selective reduction
- Dieckmann condensation
- Dieckmann reaction
- Diels–Alder reaction
- Diels–Reese reaction
- Dienol–benzene rearrangement
- Dienone–phenol rearrangement
- Dimroth rearrangement
- Di-π-methane rearrangement
- Directed ortho metalation
- Doebner modification
- Doebner reaction
- Doebner–Miller reaction, Beyer method for quinolines
- Doering–LaFlamme carbon chain extension
- Dötz reaction
- Dowd–Beckwith ring expansion reaction
- Duff reaction
- Dutt–Wormall reaction
- Dyotropic reaction

== E ==
- E1cB elimination reaction
- Eder reaction
- Edman degradation
- Eglinton reaction
- Ehrlich–Sachs reaction
- Einhorn variant
- Einhorn–Brunner reaction
- Elbs persulfate oxidation
- Elbs reaction
- Electrochemical fluorination
- Electrocyclic reaction
- Electrophilic halogenation
- Electrophilic amination
- Elimination reaction
- Emde degradation
- Emmert reaction
- Enders SAMP/RAMP hydrazone-alkylation reaction
- Ene reaction
- Enyne metathesis
- Epoxidation
- Erlenmeyer synthesis, Azlactone synthesis
- Erlenmeyer–Plöchl azlactone and amino-acid synthesis
- Eschenmoser fragmentation
- Eschenmoser sulfide contraction
- Eschweiler–Clarke reaction
- Ester pyrolysis
- Ether cleavage
- Étard reaction
- Evans aldol
- Evans–Saksena reduction
- Evans–Tishchenko reaction

== F ==
- Favorskii reaction
- Favorskii rearrangement
- Favorskii–Babayan synthesis
- Fehling test
- Feist–Benary synthesis
- Fenton reaction
- Ferrario–Ackermann reaction
- Ferrier carbocyclization
- Ferrier rearrangement
- Fétizon oxidation
- Fiesselmann thiophene synthesis
- Finkelstein reaction
- Fischer indole synthesis
- Fischer oxazole synthesis
- Fischer peptide synthesis
- Fischer phenylhydrazine and oxazone reaction
- Fischer glycosidation
- Fischer–Hepp rearrangement
- Fischer–Speier esterification
- Fischer Tropsch synthesis
- Fleming–Tamao oxidation
- Flood reaction
- Folin–Ciocalteu reagent
- Formox process
- Forster reaction
- Forster–Decker method
- Fowler process
- Franchimont reaction
- Frankland synthesis
- Frankland–Duppa reaction
- Fráter–Seebach alkylation
- Free radical halogenation
- Freund reaction
- Friedel–Crafts acylation
- Friedel–Crafts alkylation
- Friedländer synthesis
- Fries rearrangement
- Fritsch–Buttenberg–Wiechell rearrangement
- Fujimoto–Belleau reaction
- Fujiwara–Moritani reaction
- Fukuyama coupling
- Fukuyama indole synthesis
- Fukuyama reduction

== G ==
- Gabriel ethylenimine method
- Gabriel synthesis
- Gabriel–Colman rearrangement, Gabriel isoquinoline synthesis
- Gallagher–Hollander degradation
- Gassman indole synthesis
- Gastaldi synthesis
- Gattermann aldehyde synthesis
- Gattermann Koch reaction
- Gattermann reaction
- Geminal halide hydrolysis
- Gewald reaction
- Gibbs phthalic anhydride process
- Gilman reagent
- Glaser coupling
- Glycol cleavage
- Goldberg reaction
- Gomberg–Bachmann reaction
- Gomberg–Bachmann–Hey reaction
- Gomberg radical reaction
- Gould–Jacobs reaction
- Graebe–Ullmann synthesis
- Grignard degradation
- Griesbaum coozonolysis
- Grignard reaction
- Grob fragmentation
- Grubbs' catalyst in Olefin metathesis
- Grundmann aldehyde synthesis
- Gryszkiewicz–Trochimowski and McCombie method
- Guareschi–Thorpe condensation
- Guerbet reaction
- Gutknecht pyrazine synthesis

== H ==
- Hajos–Parrish–Eder–Sauer–Wiechert reaction
- Haller–Bauer reaction
- Haloform reaction
- Halogen addition reaction
- Halohydrin formation reaction
- Hammick reaction
- Hammond principle or Hammond postulate
- Hantzsch pyrrole synthesis
- Hantzsch dihydropyridine synthesis, Hantzsch pyridine synthesis
- Hantzsch pyridine synthesis, Gattermann–Skita synthesis, Guareschi–Thorpe condensation, Knoevenagel–Fries modification
- Hantzsch–Collidin synthesis
- Harries ozonolysis
- Haworth methylation
- Haworth synthesis
- Hay coupling
- Hayashi rearrangement
- Heck reaction
- Hegedus indole synthesis
- Helferich method
- Hell–Volhard–Zelinsky halogenation
- Hemetsberger indole synthesis
- Hemetsberger–Knittel synthesis
- Henkel reaction, Raecke process, Henkel process
- Henry reaction, Kamlet reaction
- Herz reaction, Herz compounds
- Herzig–Meyer alkimide group determination
- Heumann indigo synthesis
- Hiyama coupling
- Hydration reaction
- Hydroamination
- Hydrodesulfurization
- Hydrogenolysis
- Hydrosilylation
- Hinsberg indole synthesis
- Hinsberg oxindole synthesis
- Hinsberg reaction
- Hinsberg separation
- Hinsberg sulfone synthesis
- Hirao coupling
- Hoch–Campbell ethylenimine synthesis
- Hock rearrangement
- Hofmann bromamide reaction
- Hofmann degradation, Exhaustive methylation
- Hofmann elimination
- Hofmann Isonitrile synthesis, Carbylamine reaction
- Hofmann product
- Hofmann rearrangement
- Hofmann–Löffler reaction, Löffler–Freytag reaction, Hofmann–Löffler–Freytag reaction
- Hofmann–Martius rearrangement
- Hofmann's rule
- Hofmann–Sand reaction
- Homo rearrangement of steroids
- Hooker reaction
- Horner–Wadsworth–Emmons reaction
- Hoesch reaction
- Hosomi–Sakurai reaction
- Houben–Fischer synthesis
- Hudlicky fluorination
- Huisgen cycloaddition
- Hunsdiecker reaction, Hunsdiecker–Borodin reaction
- Hurd-Mori 1,2,3-thiadiazole synthesis
- Hurtley reaction
- Hydroboration
- Hydrocarbon cracking
- Hydrohalogenation

== I ==
- Indium mediated allylation
- Ing–Manske procedure
- Ipso substitution
- Ireland–Claisen rearrangement
- Isay reaction
- Ishikawa reagent
- trans-cis isomerism
- Ivanov reagent, Ivanov reaction

== J ==
- Jacobsen epoxidation
- Jacobsen rearrangement
- Janovsky reaction
- Japp–Klingemann reaction
- Japp–Maitland condensation
- Jocic reaction
- Johnson–Claisen rearrangement
- Johnson–Corey–Chaykovsky reaction
- Jones oxidation
- Jordan–Ullmann–Goldberg synthesis
- Julia olefination, Julia–Lythgoe olefination

== K ==
- Kabachnik–Fields reaction
- Kharasch–Sosnovsky reaction
- Keck asymmetric allylation
- Ketimine Mannich reaction
- Ketone halogenation
- Kiliani–Fischer synthesis
- Kindler reaction
- Kishner cyclopropane synthesis
- Knoevenagel condensation
- Knorr pyrazole synthesis
- Knorr pyrrole synthesis
- Knorr quinoline synthesis
- Koch–Haaf reaction
- Kochi reaction
- Koenigs–Knorr reaction
- Kolbe electrolysis
- Kolbe nitrile synthesis
- Kolbe–Schmitt reaction
- Kornblum oxidation
- Kornblum–DeLaMare rearrangement
- Kostanecki acylation
- Kowalski ester homologation
- Krapcho decarboxylation
- Krische allylation
- Kröhnke aldehyde synthesis
- Kröhnke oxidation
- Kröhnke pyridine synthesis
- Kucherov reaction
- Kuhn–Winterstein reaction
- Kulinkovich reaction
- Kumada coupling

== L ==
- Larock indole synthesis
- Lawesson's reagent
- Lebedev process
- Lehmstedt–Tanasescu reaction
- Leimgruber–Batcho indole synthesis
- Letts nitrile synthesis
- Leuckart reaction
- Leuckart thiophenol reaction
- Leuckart–Wallach reaction
- Leuckart amide synthesis
- Levinstein process
- Ley–Griffith oxidation, Ley oxidation
- Lieben iodoform reaction, Haloform reaction
- Liebeskind–Srogl coupling
- Liebig melamine synthesis
- Lindlar catalyst
- Lobry de Bruyn–Van Ekenstein transformation
- Lombardo methylenation
- Lossen rearrangement
- Lucas' reagent
- Luche reduction

== M ==
- Maillard reaction
- Madelung synthesis
- Malaprade reaction, Periodic acid oxidation
- Malonic ester synthesis
- Mannich reaction
- Markó–Lam deoxygenation
- Markovnikov's rule, Markownikoff rule, Markownikow rule
- Marschalk reaction
- Martinet dioxindole synthesis
- McDougall monoprotection
- McFadyen–Stevens reaction
- McMurry reaction
- Meerwein arylation
- Meerwein–Ponndorf–Verley reduction
- Meisenheimer rearrangement
- Meissenheimer complex
- Menshutkin reaction
- Metal-ion-catalyzed σ-bond rearrangement
- Mesylation
- Merckwald asymmetric synthesis
- Metallo-ene reaction
- Methylation
- Meyer–Hartmann reaction
- Meyer reaction
- Meyer synthesis
- Meyer–Schuster rearrangement
- Michael addition
- Michael addition, Michael system
- Michael condensation
- Michaelis–Arbuzov reaction
- Midland Alpine borane reduction
- Mignonac reaction
- Milas hydroxylation of olefins
- Minisci reaction
- Mislow–Evans rearrangement
- Mitsunobu reaction
- Miyaura borylation
- Modified Wittig-Claisen tandem reaction
- Molisch's test
- Mozingo reduction
- Mukaiyama aldol addition (Mukaiyama reaction)
- Mukaiyama hydration
- Myers' asymmetric alkylation

== N ==
- Nametkin rearrangement
- Narasaka–Prasad reduction
- Nazarov cyclization reaction
- Neber rearrangement
- Nef reaction
- Negishi coupling
- Negishi zipper reaction
- Nenitzescu indole synthesis
- Nenitzescu reductive acylation
- Newman–Kwart rearrangement
- Nicholas reaction
- Niementowski quinazoline synthesis
- Niementowski quinoline synthesis
- Nierenstein reaction
- NIH shift
- Ninhydrin test
- Nitroaldol reaction
- Nitrone-olefin 3+2 cycloaddition
- Normant reagents
- Noyori asymmetric hydrogenation
- Nozaki–Hiyama–Kishi reaction
- Nucleophilic acyl substitution

== O ==
- Ohira–Bestmann reaction
- Olah reagent
- Olefin metathesis
- Oppenauer oxidation
- Orton rearrangement
- Ostromyslenskii reaction, Ostromisslenskii reaction
- Overman rearrangement
- Oxidative decarboxylation
- Oxo synthesis
- Oxy-Cope rearrangement
- Oxymercuration
- Oxidation of alcohols to carbonyl compounds
- Ozonolysis

== P ==
- Paal–Knorr pyrrole synthesis
- Paal–Knorr synthesis
- Paneth technique
- Passerini reaction
- Paternò–Büchi reaction
- Pauson–Khand reaction
- Payne rearrangement
- Pechmann condensation
- Pechmann pyrazole synthesis
- Pellizzari reaction
- Pelouze synthesis
- Peptide synthesis
- Perkin alicyclic synthesis
- Perkin reaction
- Perkin rearrangement
- Perkow reaction
- Petasis reaction
- Petasis reagent
- Peterson olefination
- Peterson reaction
- Petrenko-Kritschenko piperidone synthesis
- Pfau–Plattner azulene synthesis
- Pfitzinger reaction
- Pfitzner–Moffatt oxidation
- Phosphonium coupling
- Photosynthesis
- Piancatelli rearrangement
- Pictet–Gams isoquinoline synthesis
- Pictet–Hubert reaction
- Pictet–Spengler tetrahydroisoquinoline synthesis
- Pictet–Spengler reaction
- Piloty–Robinson pyrrole synthesis
- Pinacol coupling reaction
- Pinacol rearrangement
- Pinner amidine synthesis
- Pinner method for ortho esters
- Pinner reaction
- Pinner triazine synthesis
- Pinnick oxidation
- Piria reaction
- Polonovski reaction
- Pomeranz–Fritsch reaction
- Ponzio reaction
- Prato reaction
- Prelog strain
- Prevost reaction
- Prileschajew reaction
- Prilezhaev reaction
- Prins reaction
- Prinzbach synthesis
- Protecting group
- Pschorr reaction
- Pummerer rearrangement
- Purdie methylation, Irvine–Purdie methylation

== Q ==
- Quelet reaction

== R ==
- Ramberg–Bäcklund reaction
- Raney nickel
- Rap–Stoermer condensation
- Raschig phenol process
- Rauhut–Currier reaction
- Racemization
- Reductive amination
- Reductive dehalogenation of halo ketones
- Reed reaction
- Reformatsky reaction (also transliterated as Reformatskii reaction)
- Reilly–Hickinbottom rearrangement
- Reimer–Tiemann reaction
- Reissert indole synthesis
- Reissert reaction, Reissert compound
- Reppe synthesis
- Retropinacol rearrangement
- Rieche formylation
- Riemschneider thiocarbamate synthesis
- Riley oxidations
- Ring closing metathesis
- Ring opening metathesis
- Ritter reaction
- Robinson annulation
- Robinson–Gabriel synthesis
- Robinson Schopf reaction
- Rosenmund reaction
- Rosenmund reduction
- Rosenmund–von Braun synthesis
- Roskamp reaction
- Rothemund reaction
- Rupe rearrangement
- Rubottom oxidation
- Ruff–Fenton degradation
- Ruzicka large-ring synthesis

== S ==
- Saegusa–Ito oxidation
- Sakurai reaction
- Salol reaction
- Sandheimer
- Sandmeyer diphenylurea isatin synthesis
- Sandmeyer isonitrosoacetanilide isatin synthesis
- Sandmeyer reaction
- Sanger reagent
- Saponification
- Sarett oxidation
- Schiemann reaction
- Schiff reaction
- Schiff test
- Schlenk equilibrium
- Schlosser modification
- Schlosser variant
- Schmidlin ketene synthesis
- Schmidt degradation
- Schmidt reaction
- Scholl reaction
- Schorigin Shorygin reaction, Shorygin reaction, Wanklyn reaction
- Schotten–Baumann reaction
- Seliwanoff's test
- Semidine rearrangement
- Semmler–Wolff reaction
- Seyferth–Gilbert homologation
- Shapiro reaction
- Sharpless asymmetric dihydroxylation
- Sharpless epoxidation
- Sharpless oxyamination or aminohydroxylation
- Shenck ene reaction
- Shi epoxidation
- Shiina esterification
- Shiina macrolactonization or Shiina lactonization
- Sigmatropic reaction
- Simmons–Smith reaction
- Simonini reaction
- Simonis chromone cyclization
- Simons process
- Skraup chinolin synthesis
- Skraup reaction
- Smiles rearrangement
- S_{N}Ar nucleophilic aromatic substitution
- S_{N}1
- S_{N}2
- S_{N}i
- Solvolysis
- Sommelet reaction
- Sonn–Müller method
- Sonogashira coupling
- Sørensen formol titration
- Staedel–Rugheimer pyrazine synthesis
- Stahl oxidation
- Staudinger reaction
- Staudinger synthesis
- Steglich esterification
- Stephen aldehyde synthesis
- Stetter reaction
- Stevens rearrangement
- Stieglitz rearrangement
- Stille coupling
- Stobbe condensation
- Stollé synthesis
- Stork acylation
- Stork enamine alkylation
- Strecker amino acid synthesis
- Strecker degradation
- Strecker sulfite alkylation
- Strecker synthesis
- Stereocontrolled 1,2-addition to carbonyl groups
- Suzuki coupling
- Swain equation
- Swarts reaction
- Swern oxidation

== T ==
- Tamao oxidation
- Tafel rearrangement
- Takai olefination
- Tebbe olefination
- ter Meer reaction
- Thiele reaction
- Thiol-yne reaction
- Thorpe reaction
- Tiemann rearrangement
- Tiffeneau ring enlargement reaction
- Tiffeneau–Demjanov rearrangement
- Tischtschenko reaction
- Tishchenko reaction, Tishchenko–Claisen reaction
- Tollens' reagent
- Transfer hydrogenation
- Trapp mixture
- Transesterification
- Traube purine synthesis
- Truce–Smiles rearrangement
- Tscherniac–Einhorn reaction
- Tschitschibabin reaction
- Tsuji–Trost reaction
- Tsuji–Wilkinson decarbonylation reaction
- Twitchell process
- Tyrer sulfonation process

== U ==
- Ugi reaction
- Ullmann reaction
- Upjohn dihydroxylation
- Urech cyanohydrin method
- Urech hydantoin synthesis

== V ==
- Van Leusen reaction
- Van Slyke determination
- Varrentrapp reaction
- Vilsmeier reaction
- Vilsmeier–Haack reaction
- Voight amination
- Volhard–Erdmann cyclization
- von Braun amide degradation
- von Braun reaction
- von Richter cinnoline synthesis
- von Richter reaction

== W ==
- Wacker–Tsuji oxidation
- Wagner-Jauregg reaction
- Wagner–Meerwein rearrangement
- Walden inversion
- Wallach rearrangement
- Weerman degradation
- Weinreb ketone synthesis
- Weitz–Scheffer epoxidation
- Wenker ring closure
- Wenker synthesis
- Wessely–Moser rearrangement
- Westphalen–Lettré rearrangement
- Wharton reaction
- Whiting reaction
- Wichterle reaction
- Widman–Stoermer synthesis
- Wilkinson catalyst
- Willgerodt rearrangement
- Willgerodt–Kindler reaction
- Williamson ether synthesis
- Winstein reaction
- Wittig reaction
- Wittig rearrangement:
  - 1,2-Wittig rearrangement
  - 2,3-Wittig rearrangement
- Wittig–Horner reaction
- Wohl degradation
- Wohl–Aue reaction
- Wohler synthesis
- Wohl–Ziegler reaction
- Wolffenstein–Böters reaction
- Wolff rearrangement
- Wolff–Kishner reduction
- Woodward cis-hydroxylation
- Woodward–Hoffmann rule
- Wulff–Dötz reaction
- Wurtz coupling, Wurtz reaction
- Wurtz–Fittig reaction

== Y ==
- Yamada–Okamoto purine synthesis
- Yamaguchi esterification

== Z ==
- Zaitsev's rule
- Zeisel determination
- Zerevitinov determination, Zerewitinoff determination
- Ziegler condensation
- Ziegler method
- Zimmermann reaction
- Zincke disulfide cleavage
- Zincke nitration
- Zincke reaction
- Zincke–Suhl reaction
- Zinin reduction

== See also ==
- Stigler's law of eponymy
- Name reaction
- List of organic compounds
- List of inorganic compounds
- Named inorganic compounds
- List of biomolecules
- List of minerals
