= Hemetsberger =

Hemetsberger is a surname. Notable people with the surname include:

- Daniel Hemetsberger (born 1991), Austrian alpine skier
- Stella Hemetsberger (born 1999), Austrian kickboxer and Muay Thai fighter

== See also ==
- Hemetsberger indole synthesis, a chemical reaction
