= Walter Dieckmann =

German chemist (1869–1925)

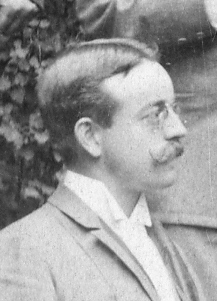
- Walter Dieckmann
- Born: 8 October 1869; Hamburg, Germany
- Died: 12 January 1925 (aged 55); Munich, Germany
- Education: Ludwig-Maximilians-Universität München
- Known for: Dieckmann condensation
- Scientific career
- Workplaces: BASF, Ludwig-Maximilians-Universität München
- Doctoral advisor: Bamberger, Adolf von Baeyer

Walter Dieckmann (8 October 1869 – 12 January 1925) was a German chemist. He is the namesake of the Dieckmann condensation, the intramolecular reaction of diesters with base to give β-keto esters.

Dieckmann studied at the Ludwig-Maximilians-Universität München and was an assistant of Adolf von Baeyer.
