= Aston–Greenburg rearrangement =

The Aston–Greenburg rearrangement is a name reaction in organic chemistry. It allows for the generation of tertiary α-alkylesters from corresponding α-haloketones through a 1,2-rearrangement, with the use of an alkoxide.
