= Isay reaction =

Reaction in organic chemistry

Named after	Oskar Isay
Reaction type	Ring forming reaction

The Isay reaction also known as Gabriel-Isay condensation is an organic reaction in which certain diaminopyrimidines are transformed into pterins by condensation with a 1,2-dicarbonyl compound, such as 2,3-butanedione. The reaction is named after Oskar Isay.

== See also ==
- List of organic reactions
