= Varrentrapp reaction =

Chemical reaction

The Varrentrapp reaction, also named Varrentrapp degradation, is a name reaction in the organic chemistry. It is named after Franz Varrentrapp, who described this reaction in 1840. The reaction entails the degradation of an unsaturated carboxylic acid into a saturated acid with two fewer carbon atoms and acetic acid. The fragmentation is induced by action of molten alkali.

== Stoichiometry and mechanism ==
Below, the reaction mechanism is shown for the degradation of (E)-4-hexenoic acid.

Mechanismus der Varrentrapp-Reaktion

First, the carboxylic acid reacts with the caustic potash 1 to form its carboxylate. A series of base-catalyzed isomerizations leads to migration of the alkene into conjugation with the carboxylate (from (2 to 5). Reaction of this α,β-unsaturated carbonyl compound with hydroxide leads to a retro-aldol-condensation reaction, fragmenting the molecule into a shortened carbon chain with an aldehyde (7) and a separate acetate (9). Hydroxide then causes dehydrogenation of the aldehyde to form an acid (10).

Further insight is obtained by study of the Varrentrapp reaction for the conversion of oleic acid to palmitic acid. If the reaction is quenched before formation of the acetate, the recovered C18 acid consists of numerous isomers of octadecenoic acid (but not α,β-octadecenoic acid). This observation suggests that the base (KOH) isomerizes the double bond. It is speculated that this occurs via deprotonation of the allylic C-H's.

Likewise cinnamic acid is converted to benzoic acid.

== Applications ==
The reaction conditions are harsh: medium molten potassium hydroxide at temperatures in the range of 250 to 300 °C. The reaction has been of some importance in structure elucidation of certain fatty acids, but has little practical synthetic value. The original 1840 Varrentrapp reaction concerned the conversion of oleate to palmitate and acetate.
