= Cadogan–Sundberg indole synthesis =

Reaction in organic chemistry

Named after	John Cadogan; Richard J. Sundberg
Reaction type	Ring forming reaction

Identifiers
RSC ontology ID	RXNO:0000509

The Cadogan–Sundberg indole synthesis, or simply Cadogan indole synthesis, is a name reaction in organic chemistry that allows for the generation of indoles from o-nitrostyrenes with the use of trialkyl phosphites, such as triethyl phosphite.

== Mechanism ==
o-nitrostyrene first reacts with triethyl phosphite, and the nitro group is converted to a nitroso group. The nitroso group then reacts with the alkene, and N-hydroxylindole is formed, which reacts again with triethyl phosphite to form the indole.

== Application ==
The Cadogan–Sundberg indole synthesis has been used as an intermediate step in the total synthesis of Tjipanazole E, transforming 2-[trans-2-[5-Chloro-2-nitrophenyl)vinyl]-5-chloro-1H-indole to 5,5’-Dichloro-2,2’-biindole.
