= Amine alkylation =

Organic reaction between amine and alkyl halide

Amine alkylation (amino-dehalogenation) is a type of organic reaction between an alkyl halide and ammonia or an amine. The reaction is called nucleophilic aliphatic substitution (of the halide), and the reaction product is a higher substituted amine. The method is widely used in the laboratory, but less so industrially, where alcohols are often preferred alkylating agents.

$$\ce{\underbrace{H-\!\!\overset{\displaystyle R1 \atop |}{\underset{| \atop \displaystyle R2}{N}}\!\!\!\!:}_{{primary\ or \atop secondary}\atop amine}}
+ \underbrace\ce{R3X}_{\text{halogeno-}\atop\text{alkane}}
\ce{->}
\underbrace\ce{:\!\!\!\!\overset{\displaystyle R1 \atop |}{\underset{| \atop \displaystyle R2}{N}}\!\!-R3}
_{\begin{matrix}
{{\text{alkyl-}\atop \text{substituted}} \atop \text{amine}} \\
\ce{(secondary \atop or\ tertiary)}
\end{matrix}}
+ \ce{\underbrace{HX}_{halogen\atop acid}}$$

When the amine is a tertiary amine the reaction product is a quaternary ammonium salt in the Menshutkin reaction:

$$\ce{\underbrace{R3-\!\!\overset{\displaystyle R1 \atop |}{\underset{| \atop \displaystyle R2}{N}}\!\!\!\!:}_{tertiary \atop amine}}
+ \underbrace\ce{R4X}_{\text{halogeno-}\atop\text{alkane}}
\ce{->
\underbrace{\underbrace{R3-\overset{\displaystyle R1 \atop |}{\underset{| \atop \displaystyle R2}{N+}}\!\!-R4}_{{quaternary \atop ammonium} \atop cation}
+ \underbrace{X^-}_{halide\atop anion}}_{quaternary\ ammonium\ salt}
}$$

Amines and ammonia are generally sufficiently nucleophilic to undergo direct alkylation, often under mild conditions. The reactions are complicated by the tendency of the product (a primary amine or a secondary amine) to react with the alkylating agent. For example, reaction of 1-bromooctane with ammonia yields almost equal amounts of the primary amine and the secondary amine. Therefore, for laboratory purposes, N-alkylation is often limited to the synthesis of tertiary amines. An exception is the amination of alpha-halo carboxylic acids that do permit synthesis of primary amines with ammonia. Intramolecular reactions of haloamines X-(CH_{2})_{n}-NH_{2} give cyclic aziridines, azetidines and pyrrolidines.

N-alkylation is a general and useful route to quaternary ammonium salts from tertiary amines, because overalkylation is not possible.

Examples of N-alkylation with alkyl halides are the syntheses of benzylaniline, 1-benzylindole, and azetidine. Another example is found in the derivatization of cyclen. Industrially, ethylenediamine is produced by alkylation of ammonia with 1,2-dichloroethane.

== Aniline and related aryl derivatives ==
Traditionally, aryl amination is difficult reaction which usually requires "activated" aryl halides, such as those with strong electron-withdrawing groups such as nitro groups ortho or para to the halogen atom. For the arylation of amines with unactivated aryl halides, the Buchwald-Hartwig reaction is useful. In this process, palladium complexes serve as catalysts.

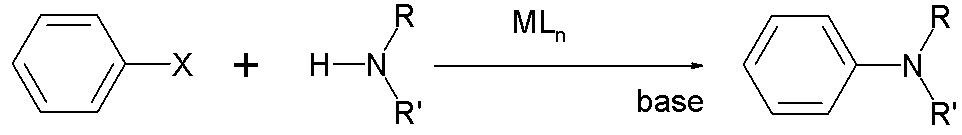

== Alkylation using alcohols ==
Industrially, most alkylations are typically conducted using alcohols, not alkyl halides. Alcohols are less expensive than alkyl halides and their alkylation does not produce salts, the disposal of which can be problematic. Key to the alkylation of alcohols is the use of catalysts that render the hydroxyl group a good leaving group. The largest scale N-alkylation is the production of the methylamines from ammonia and methanol, resulting in approximately 500,000 tons/y of methylamine, dimethylamine, and trimethylamine. The reaction is poorly selective, requiring separation of the three products. Many other industrially significant alkyl amines are produced, again on a large scale, from the alcohols. Epoxides are another class of halide-free N-alkylating agents, useful in the production of ethanolamines.

== Alternative alkylation methods ==
For laboratory use, the N-alkylation reaction is often unselective. A variety of alternative methods have been developed, such as the Delépine reaction, which uses hexamine. The Gabriel synthesis, involving the use of an equivalent to NH_{2}^{−}, only applies to primary alkyl halides.
