= Hegedus indole synthesis =

Chemical reaction

Named after	Louis S. Hegedus
Reaction type	Ring forming reaction

The Hegedus indole synthesis is a name reaction in organic chemistry that allows for the generation of indoles through palladium(II)-mediated oxidative cyclization of ortho-alkenyl anilines. The reaction can still take place for tosyl-protected amines.

== Application ==
2-Allylaniline can be converted to 2-Methylindole using the Hegedus indole synthesis.

Mechanism:
