= Lombardo methylenation =

Chemical reaction

Named after	Luciano Lombardo
Reaction type	Organic redox reaction

In organic chemistry, the Lombardo methylenation is a name reaction that allows for the methylenation of carbonyl compounds with the use of Lombardo's reagent, which is a mix of zinc, dibromomethane, and titanium tetrachloride.

== Applications ==
The Lombardo methylenation has been used in the total synthesis of tetrodotoxin and hirsutene.
