= Perkin rearrangement =

Chemical reaction

The Perkin rearrangement (coumarin–benzofuran ring contraction) is a rearrangement reaction in which a 2-halocoumarin in the presence of hydroxide undergoes a ring contraction to form a benzofuran. The name reaction recognizes William Henry Perkin, who first reported it in 1870. Several proposals have been made for the reaction mechanism, all of which involve initial opening of the lactone to give a carboxylate and phenolate.
