= Dieckmann condensation =

Chemical reaction of diesters

Named after	Walter Dieckmann
Reaction type	Ring forming reaction

Identifiers
Organic Chemistry Portal	dieckmann-condensation
RSC ontology ID	RXNO:0000065

The Dieckmann condensation is the intramolecular chemical reaction of diesters with base to give β-keto esters. It is named after the German chemist Walter Dieckmann (1869–1925). The equivalent intermolecular reaction is the Claisen condensation. Dieckmann condensations are highly effective routes to 5-, 6-, and 7-member rings, but poor for larger rings.

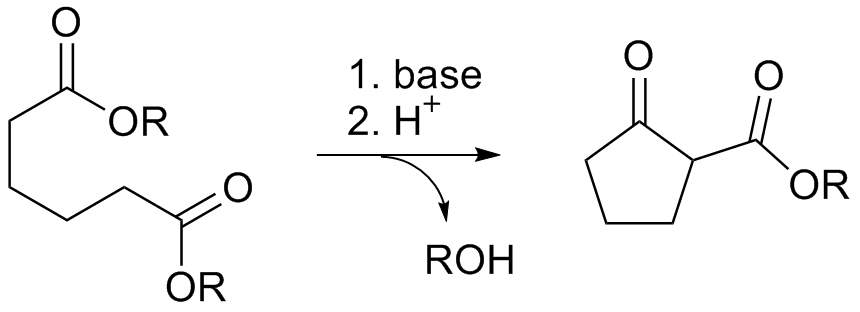
The Dieckmann condensation

== Reaction mechanism ==
Deprotonation of an ester at the α-position generates an enolate ion which then undergoes a 5-exo-trig nucleophilic attack to give a cyclic enol. Protonation with a Brønsted–Lowry acid (H_{3}O^{+} for example) re-forms the β-keto ester.

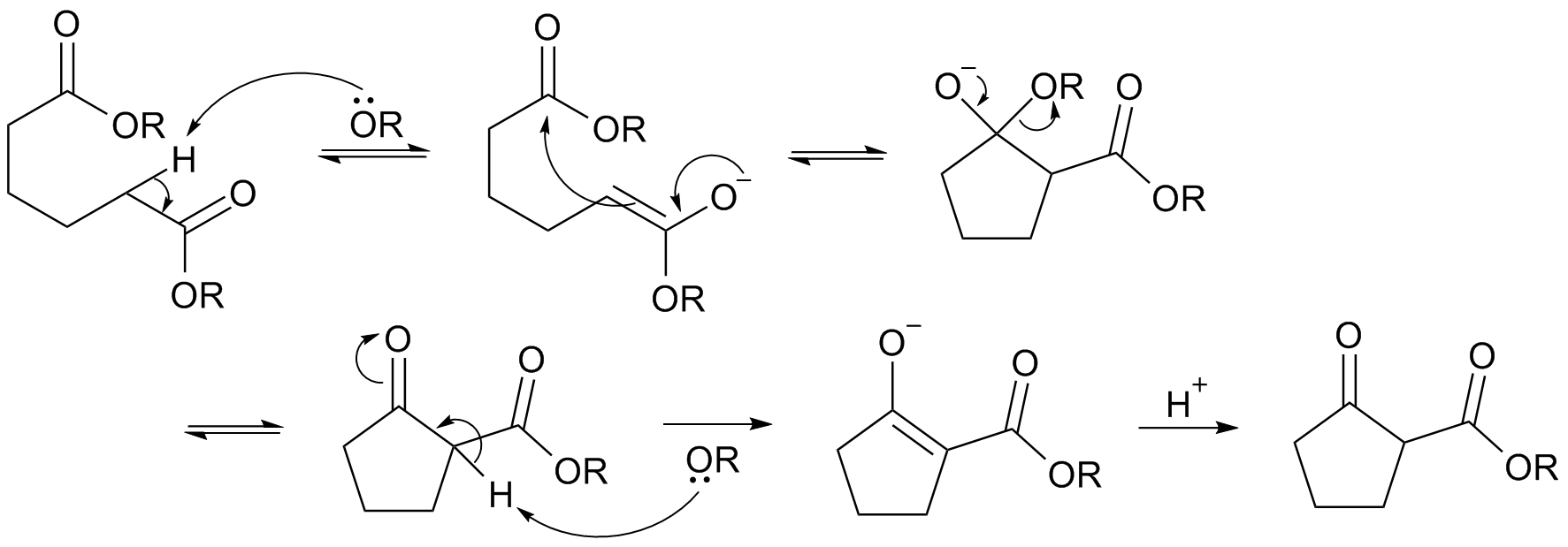
Dieckmann condensation reaction mechanism for the example given

Due to the steric stability of five- and six-membered rings, these structures will preferentially be formed. 1,6 diesters will form five-membered cyclic β-keto esters, while 1,7 diesters will form six-membered β-keto esters.

Animation of the reaction mechanism

== See also ==
- Claisen condensation
- Gabriel–Colman rearrangement
- Thorpe reaction
