= Piancatelli rearrangement =

Chemical rearrangement

In organic synthesis, the Piancatelli rearrangement is a strategy for the synthesis of 4-hydroxycyclopentenone derivatives from furfural developed by Italian chemist Giovanni Piancatelli and his coworkers in 1976.

== Process ==
The strategy is a Grignard addition to the aldehyde, followed by acid-catalyzed rearrangement:

Piancatelli's reaction scheme used to synthesize 2-furylcarbinols from the biomass furfural.

Lewis acids were discovered to help drive the second reaction to completion. Conversely, substituents stabilizing carbocations at the benzylic position impede the reaction.

== Rearrangement mechanism ==
The mechanism of the rearrangement is unclear. Piancatelli originally proposed that the rearrangment proceeds through a (conrotatory) 4π thermal electrocyclization, very much like the Nazarov cyclization reaction:

Piancatelli rearrangement

This mechanism was suggested when studying ^{1}H NMR spectra as it became apparent that the final products exclusively delivered the trans isomer between the OH and the R (depicted).

D'Auria, who performed the rearrangement in boiling water without an acid catalyst, observed both trans and cis products. He proposed instead a zwitterionic pathway:

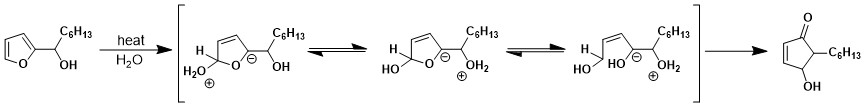
Proposed mechanism by D'Auria for the Piancatelli rearrangement.

Another proposed mechanism is from Yin and co-workers, involving aldol/retro-aldol intramolecular addition:

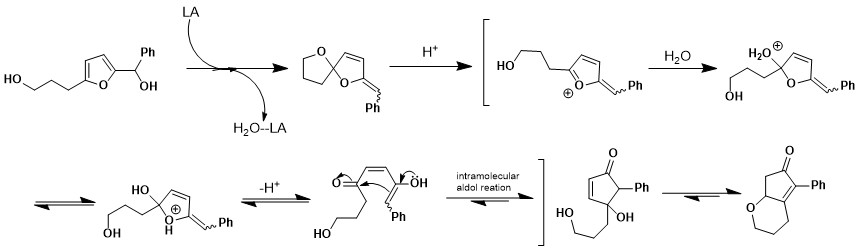
Mechanism proposed by Yin that follows an aldol-type reaction.

== Applications ==
The Piancatelli strategy has been used extenively for prostaglandin synthesis:

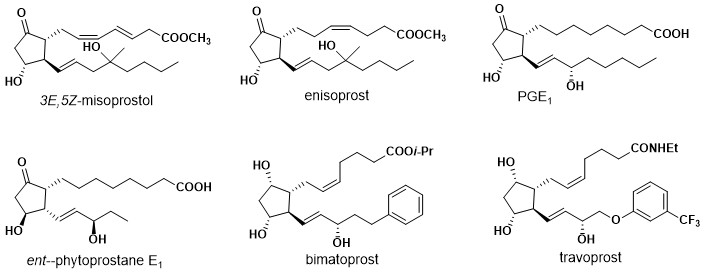
Some products synthesized through the Piancatelli rearrangement: 3E,5Z-misoprostol, enisoprost, 4-fluoro-enisoprost, 2-normisoprostol, prostaglandin E_{1}, ent-phytoprostane E_{1}, 16-epi-phytoprostane E_{1}, bimatoprost, and travoprost.

== See also ==
- Achmatowicz oxidation — another reaction of furancarbinols
