= Martinet dioxindole synthesis =

Chemical reaction

The Martinet dioxindole synthesis was first reported in 1913 by J. Martinet. It is a chemical reaction in which a primary or secondary aniline or substituted aromatic amine is condensed with ethyl or methyl ester of mesoxalic acid to make a dioxindole in the absence of oxygen.

== Proposed mechanism ==
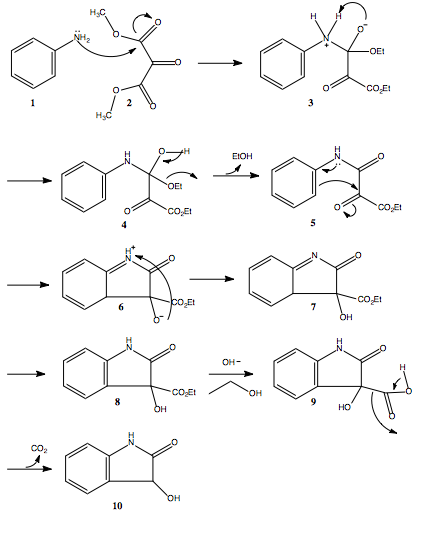

In the first step, the amino group on the aniline (1) attacks the carbonyl of the ethyl oxomalonate (2). A proton from the nitrogen is extracted by the oxygen and an alcohol group forms (3). The carbonyl re-forms to make a keto group and an ethanol molecule leaves (4). Next, a ring closing reaction occurs by the bond from the aromatic benzene ring attacking the partially positive carbonyl to form a five-member ring (5). After a proton transfer (6), an isomerization or a [1,3] hydride shift occurs and aromaticity is restored to the six-membered ring (7). In the presence of base, the ester is hydrolyzed, ethanol is lost (8) and a decarboxylation occurs (9). The resulting product is the desired dioxindole (10).

In the presence of oxygen, dioxindole converts to isatin through oxidation.

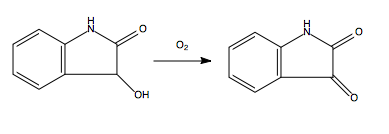

== Applications ==
The Martinet dioxindole synthesis is utilized in the preparation of oxindole derivatives. Oxindole derivatives found in natural products are gaining popularity in research because of their structural diversity. 3-substituted-3-hydroxy-2-oxindole is the central structure of a wide variety of biologically important compounds found in natural products. The 3-substituted-3-hydroxy-2-oxindole structure holds anti-oxidant, anti-cancer, anti-HIV, and neuroprotective properties. The utilization of this core structure for drug synthesis and the relevant cellular pathways involved are being extensively studied. The enantio-selective addition of 3-substituted oxindole derivatives to different electrophiles gives access to chiral 3,3-disubstituted oxindole derivatives. The dioxindole is a strong nucleophile for the Michael addition of dioxindoles to nitroalkenes in order to obtain 3,3-disubstituted oxindole derivatives.

== Experimental examples ==
The Martinet dioxindole synthesis proceeds with an alkoxyaniline, 3,4,5-trimethoxyaniline, which reacts with an oxomalonic ester in glacial acetic acid to synthesize 2-carbethoxy-4,5,6-trimethoxyindoxyl, 2-carbethoxy-3,4,5,6-tetramethoxyindole and 4,5,6-trimethoxy-3-hydroxy-3-carbethoxyindole.

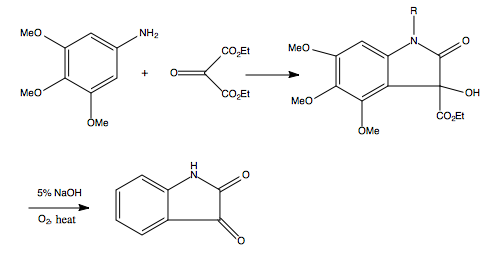

== Dioxindole ==
Dioxindole is a non-aromatic heterocyclic organic compound. It has a bicyclic structure consisting of a six-membered aromatic ring fused to a five-membered nitrogen containing ring. It is a hydroxy derivative of oxindole first prepared by reducing isatin with sodium amalgam in an alkaline solution.

== See also ==
- Indole
- Oxindole
