= Fujiwara–Moritani reaction =

Chemical reaction

In organic chemistry, the Fujiwara–Moritani reaction is a type of cross coupling reaction where an aromatic C-H bond is directly coupled to an olefinic C-H bond, generating a new C-C bond. This reaction is performed in the presence of a transition metal, typically palladium. The reaction was discovered by Yuzo Fujiwara and Ichiro Moritani in 1967. An external oxidant is required to this reaction to be run catalytically. Thus, this reaction can be classified as a C-H activation reaction, an oxidative Heck reaction, and a C-H olefination. Surprisingly, the Fujiwara–Moritani reaction was discovered before the Heck reaction.

The need for prefunctionalization of either component is obviated in this reaction, which is desirable because it can shorten syntheses, provide atom economical routes, and enable late stage functionalization of complex molecules. Despite the potential of the Fujiwara-Moritani transformation, it is not often utilized by organic chemists due to the typically harsh reaction conditions, such as acidic, oxidative and high temperature conditions, that most functional groups can not survive.

== Mechanism ==
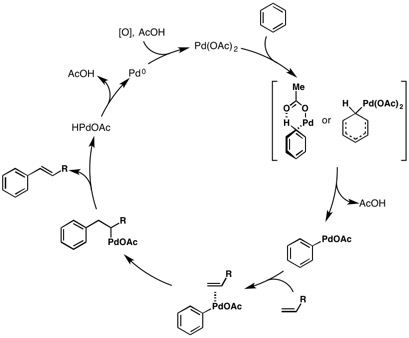
Figure 1: Mechanism of Fujiwara-Moritani reaction

The mechanism of the Fujiwara–Moritani reaction is not fully understood. The most widely accepted mechanism is as shown in Figure 1. The sequence begins by formation of the palladium–Aryl cationic complex via Friedel-Crafts or concerted deprotonation metallation process which eliminates an acetic acid to generate a palladium–Aryl species. An olefin then coordinates to the palladium and undergoes a 1,2-migratory insertion, forming a C-C bond. The following β-hydride elimination yields the styrene type product and a palladium hydride species. Deprotonation of this palladium(II) species by acetate (i.e., reductive elimination of the H-OAc pair) yields palladium(0) which in the presence of an oxidant, e.g. Cu(II), can be re-oxidized to palladium(II) and undergo the catalytic cycle once more.

== Industrial example ==
Ube Industries succeeded in an industrial application of the Fujiwara–Moritani reaction for the first time 1982. In presence of a catalytic amount of palladium acetate, dimethyl phthalate was directly converted to a biaryl species that was then dehydrated to give biphthalic anhydride, a precursor of polyimide polymers. There are two different potential biaryl products, a symmetric or an asymmetric form. They achieved selective synthesis of either form via ligand control.

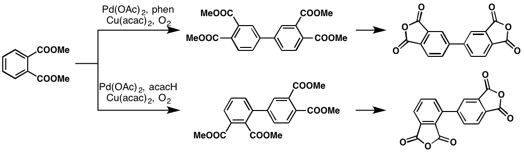

== Latest examples ==
Even though the original conditions of the Fujiwara–Moritani reaction are not practical, this reaction has significant importance in the sense that it showed the possibility for other transformations that were later developed. Recent advancements have unveiled the mechanism of the Fujiwara–Moritani reaction to some extent which has allowed the development of new systems that enable similar transformations on complex substrates.

One of the earliest examples of the Fujiwara–Moritani reaction in total synthesis is found in the enantioselective total synthesis of clavicipitic acid by the Murakami group. They used stoichiometric palladium acetate to couple 4-bromo indole and protected dehydroalanine. Notably, the aryl bromide survived the reaction conditions which permitted orthogonal C-H olefination techniques to be utilized. Differentiation of the C3 and C4 positions was now possible, whereas conventional cross coupling methods with the dihalogenated indole had regioselectivity issues.

Fagnou's group showed that direct C-H arylation of an indole is possible using palladium catalysis with a copper oxidant. Although the reaction requires high temperature, acidic solvent, and solvent quantities of the coupling partner, this demonstration of a selective and direct hetero aryl-aryl coupling is notable.

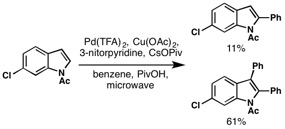

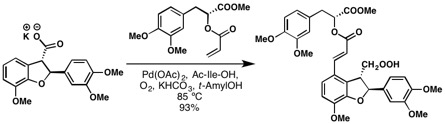
The Yu group developed an Aryl C-H olefination reaction in which aryl carboxylic acids were directly coupled to olefins through the aryl C-H bond. Note: this is not the Fujiwara–Moritani reaction because it is directed by the free acid. The Fujiwara–Moritani reaction is typified by non-directed C–H palladation consistent with regioselectivity of Friedel-Crafts reactions. They also applied their methodology for the total synthesis of (+)-Lithospermic acid. The product yield is as high as 93% despite the complexity of both coupling partners. This is one of the best examples in which C-H olefination simplifies the retro synthesis and demonstrates a convergent synthesis of this complex natural product.

The Lipshutz group dramatically improved the conditions of the Fujiwara–Moritani reaction by developing reaction conditions that utilize water as the solvent and obviate the need for an exogenous acid. Although the substrate scope is limited to p-methoxy aryl species, Lipshutz's report suggested that the Fujiwra-Moritani can be run under milder conditions.
