= Modified Wittig–Claisen tandem reaction =

Modified Wittig–Claisen tandem reactions

Application of modified Wittig–Claisen tandem reactions for construction of 4-cyclooctenone structure

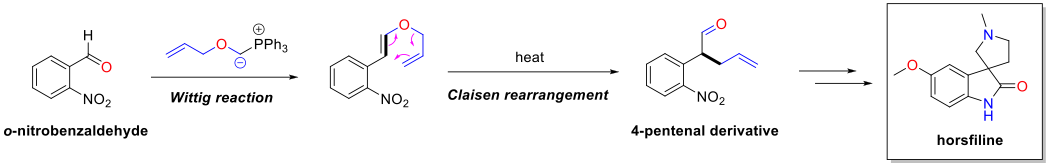
Application of modified Wittig–Claisen tandem reactions to the total synthesis of horsfiline

Modified Wittig–Claisen tandem reaction is a cascade reaction that combines the Wittig reaction and Claisen rearrangement together. The Wittig reaction generates the allyl vinyl ether intermediate that further participates in a Claisen rearrangement to generate the final γ,δ-unsaturated ketone or aldehyde product (Figure "Modified Wittig–Claisen tandem reactions").

The modified Wittig–Claisen tandem reaction has been a useful retrosynthetic strategy and has been applied to the synthesis of various complex natural products and other molecules. This reaction is especially useful for construction of cyclic ketones with double bond at the γ, δ-position. Paquette and co-workers reported the synthesis of 4-cyclooctenone structure by expanding the six-membered ring of a 2-cyclohexanone structure. The key step was a tandem process that combines Tebbe olefination (a reaction similar to Wittig reaction) with Claisen rearrangement (Figure "Application of modified Wittig–Claisen tandem reactions for construction of 4-cyclooctenone structure").

Tandem Wittig–Claisen reaction has also been applied to the construction of the spiro[pyrrolidin-3,3’-oxindole] ring system in natural products such as horsfiline. The synthesis started with a simple o-nitrobenzaldehyde. A Wittig–Claisen reaction sequence converted the starting material to a 4-pentenal derivative that could serve as a versatile intermediate for the synthesis of various natural products. In this case, the 4-pentenal derivative was further converted to the natural product horsfiline, the active ingredient of a traditional herbal medicine with analgesic effects.
