= Delépine reaction =

Chemical reaction

The Delépine reaction is the organic synthesis of primary amines (4) by reaction of benzyl or alkyl halides (1) with hexamethylenetetramine (2) followed by acid hydrolysis of the quaternary ammonium salt (3). It is named after the French chemist Marcel Delépine, who first reported it in 1895.

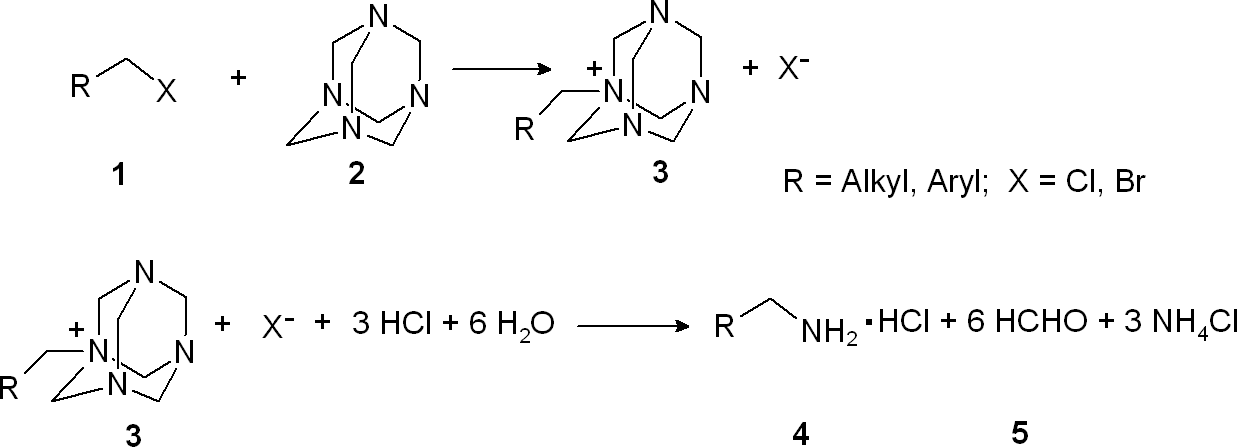
Delepin reaction

Advantages of this reaction are selective access to the primary amine without side reactions from easily accessible reactants with short reaction times and relatively mild reaction conditions. Downsides include that the typical solvent, chloroform, is toxic and that the overall reaction has poor atom economy, including production of several equivalents of formaldehyde byproduct (5).

An example is the synthesis of 2-bromoallylamine from 2,3-dibromopropene.

== Reaction mechanism ==
The benzyl halide or alkyl halide 1 reacts with hexamethylenetetramine to a quaternary ammonium salt 3, each time just alkylating one nitrogen atom. By refluxing in concentrated ethanolic hydrochloric acid solution this salt is converted to the primary amine together with formaldehyde (as the acetal with ethanol) and ammonium chloride.

Depending on the hydrolysis conditions and structure, the nitrogen might instead be lost from the carbon where it had bonded in the first step to give a benzylic aldehyde (the Sommelet reaction).

== See also ==
- Forster-Decker-Becker method – form secondary amines via similar imine intermediate
- Gabriel synthesis – imide auxiliary instead of HMTA
