= Reissert reaction =

Named after	Arnold Reissert
Reaction type	Addition reaction

The Reissert reaction is a series of chemical reactions that transforms quinoline to quinaldic acid, with concomitant reduction of an acylant to an aldehyde.

Quinolines will react with acid chlorides and potassium cyanide to give 1-acyl-2-cyano-1,2-dihydroquinolines, also known as Reissert compounds. Hydrolysis gives the desired quinaldic acid via a 1,3-dipolar fused-oxazolium intermediate.

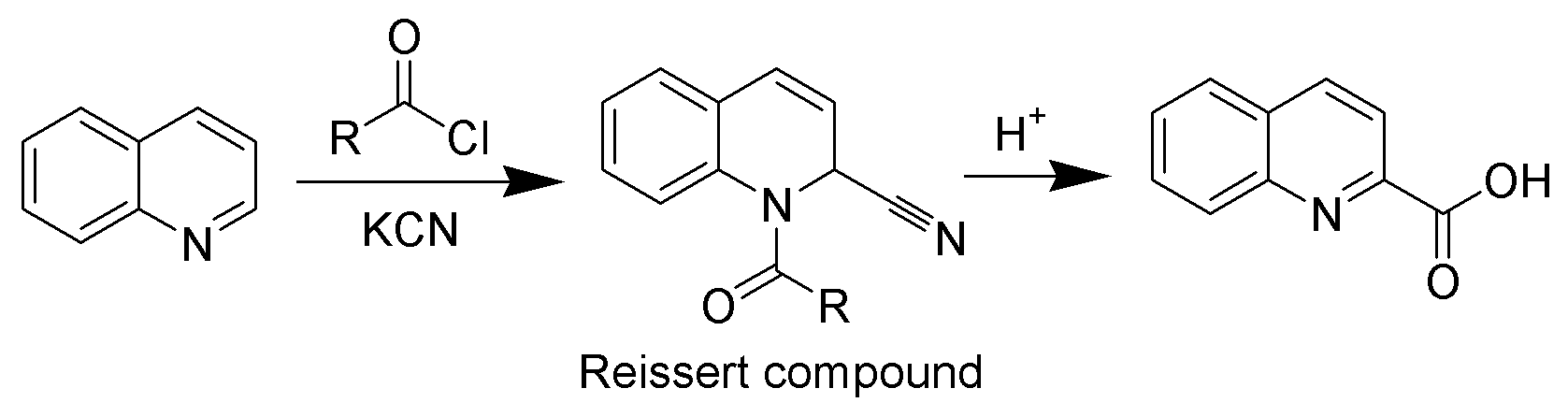
The Reissert reaction

Other nucleophiles than cyanide can also be used to quench the acylquinolium intermediate, possibly enantioselectively.

Alternatively, the Reissert compound has an acidic proton α to the cyanide moiety, and the conjugate base is susceptible to alkylation. The resulting alkylated compounds hydrolyze in aqueous base, eliminating both an equivalent of hydrogen cyanide and the carboxylic acid corresponding the acyl moiety.

The Reissert reaction is also successful with isoquinolines. Pyridines do not undergo the Reissert reaction per se, but slowly form para adducts under Reissert conditions. Quinoline N-oxides react to form the cyanoquinoline immediately (a Polonovski-like reaction); it is unclear if the intermediate Reissert adduct exists stably.
