= Adams decarboxylation =

The Adams decarboxylation is a chemical reaction that involved the decarboxylation of coumarins which have carboxylic acid group in the third position. The decarboxylation is achieved by aqueous solution of sodium bisulfite, heat and a concentrated solution of sodium hydroxide.
