= Creighton process =

The Creighton process involves the hydrogenation of a 6 carbon chain aldehyde. The reactant is 2,3,4,5,6-pentahydroxyhexanal (an aldehyde) and the product is 1,2,3,4,5,6-hexanehexol (an alcohol). The product thus has two more hydrogen atoms than the reactant: -CHO is replaced by -CH_{2}OH.

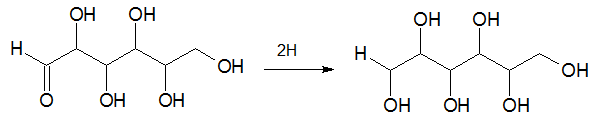

The Creighton process was patented in the 1920s.
