= Gabriel–Colman rearrangement =

Chemical reaction

The Gabriel–Colman rearrangement is the chemical reaction of a saccharin or phthalimido ester with a strong base, such as an alkoxide, to form substituted isoquinolines. First described in 1900 by chemists Siegmund Gabriel and James Colman, this rearrangement, a ring expansion, is seen to be general if there is an enolizable hydrogen on the group attached to the nitrogen, since it is necessary for the nitrogen to abstract a hydrogen to form the carbanion that will close the ring. As shown in the case of the general example below, X is either CO or SO_{2}.

Gabriel-Colman Rearrangement Overall Reaction

== Mechanism ==
Gabriel–Colman rearrangement mechanism

The reaction mechanism starts with an attack on the carbonyl group by a strong base, such as methoxide ion. The ring is then opened, forming an imide anion. This is then followed by a rapid isomerization of the imide anion to the carbanion. This is facilitated by the electron withdrawing effect of the substituent, which allows for greater stabilization of the adjacent carbanion with respect to the imide anion. The reaction is then completed when the methoxide is displaced by the ring closing, which results in a ring expansion. The rate determining step of this reaction is the attack of the carbanion on the carbomethoxy group.

The displacement of the methoxide is analogous to the displacement seen in the Dieckman condensation, as it is also a result of a ring closure.

Gabriel-Colman Rearrangement Tautomerism

Furthermore, tautomerization can occur on both of the carbonyl groups on the ring, with interconversion of the keto form to the enol form and the amide form to the imidic acid form.

== Applications ==
The major application of the Gabriel–Colman rearrangement is in the formation of isoquinolines, due to the relatively high yield of the desired products. Therefore, studies in which either the product or an intermediate is an isoquinoline, the Gabriel–Colman rearrangement can be utilized. This reaction has been utilized in the production of intermediates for the synthesis of potential anti-inflammatory agents. It has also been used in the study of phthalimide and saccharin derivatives as mechanism based inhibitors for three enzymes; the human leukocyte elastase, cathepsin G and proteinase 3. Phthalimide derivatives were seen to be inactive, while saccharin derivatives were seen to be fair inhibitors of these enzymes.

A first example of the Gabriel–Colman rearrangement.

In a study of the derivatives of 3-Oxo-1,2-benzoisothiazoline-2-acetic acid 1,1-dioxide, the Gabriel–Colman rearrangement was employed in the conversion of Isopropyl (1,1-dioxido-3-oxo-1,2-benzothiazol-2(3H)-yl)acetate to Isopropyl 4-hydroxy-2H-1,2-benzothiazine-3-carboxylate 1,1-dioxide, as shown above. This reaction has shown a percent yield of 85%.

Another example of the Gabriel–Colman rearrangement.

In another study, N-phthalimidoglycine ethyl ester was used to synthesize 4-hydroxyisoquinoline through use of a Gabriel–Colman rearrangement, as shown above. This reaction has shown a percent yield of 91%. The formation of this product was an important step in the study of the synthesis of 4,4′-functionalized 1,1′-biisoquinolines.

== See also ==
- Dieckmann reaction
- Claisen condensation
- Chan rearrangement
