= Metallo-ene reaction =

The metallo-ene reaction is a chemical reaction employed within organic synthesis. Mechanistically similar to the classic ene reaction, the metallo-ene reaction involves a six-member cyclic transition state that brings an allylic species and an alkene species together to undergo a rearrangement. The initial allylic group migrates to one terminus of the alkene reactant and a new carbon-carbon sigma bond is formed between the allylic species and the other terminus of the alkene reactant. In the metallo-ene reaction, a metal ion (Mg, Zn, Pd, Ni etc.) acts as the migrating group rather than a hydrogen atom as in the classic ene reaction.

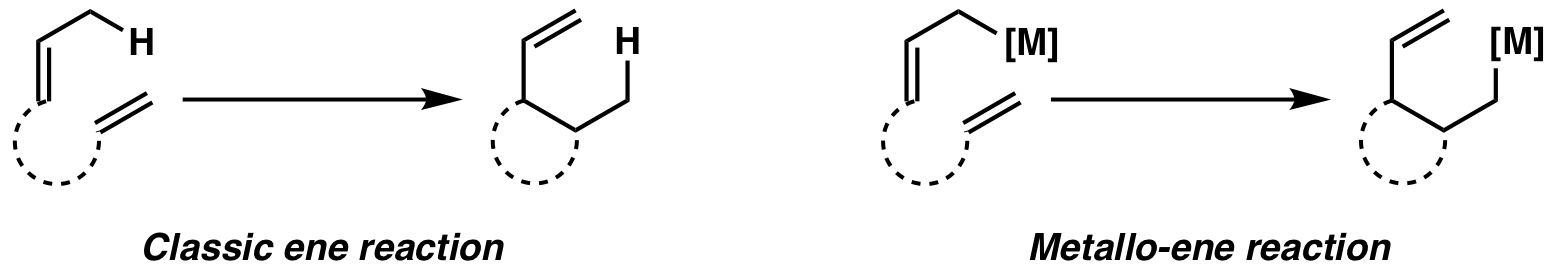

== Initial Studies ==
Metallo-ene reaction was first studied by Lehmkuhl et al., and since then has gradually gained popularity among the synthetic community throughout the better understanding of its mechanism and potential as a synthetic tool.

== Classification ==
Generally speaking, metallo-ene reaction has both an intramolecular and an intermolecular version. For the former, the reaction can be classified into two types by the skeletal connectivity. In Type I, a carbon linkage connects the alkene fragment to the terminal carbon of the allyl fragment of the molecule, while in Type II the alkene fragment is connected to the internal carbon of the allyl fragment.

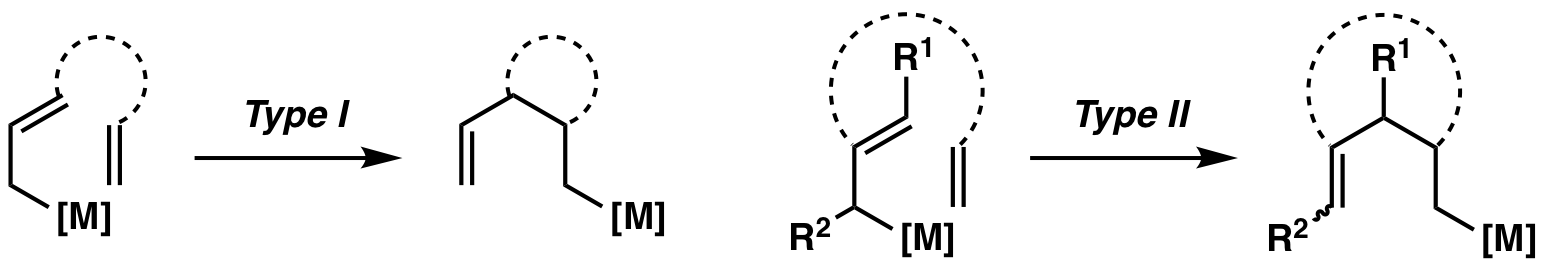

== Mechanism ==
Historically, there has been a long-standing uncertainty about the precise mechanism of metallo-ene reaction. Three possible mechanisms—a concerted mechanism, a stepwise mechanism and a metal-catalyzed mechanism have been postulated and studied over the past few decades. According to computational analyses, metallo-ene reaction tends to proceed via a concerted six-member transition state, although the exact mechanism was found to vary and depends on the metal.

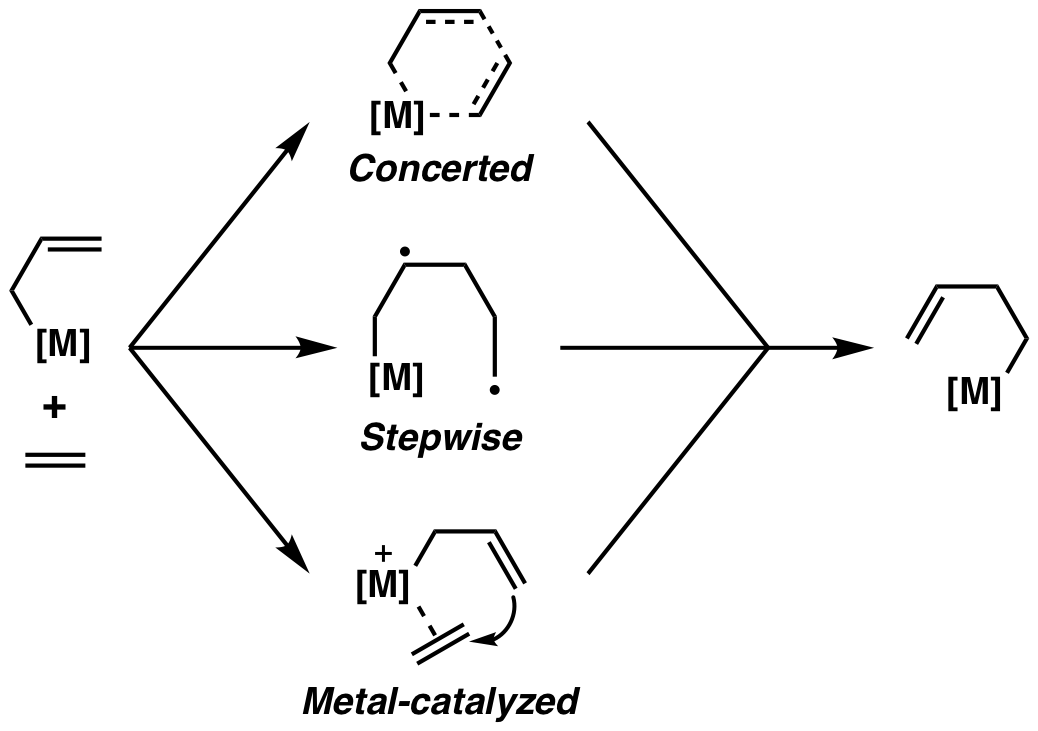

== Selectivity ==
=== Regioselectivity ===
For Type II reaction, two possible products can be expected if the two termini of the allyl piece are unsymmetrically substituted, depending on which carbon engages in the formation of a new sigma bond. Interestingly, Oppolzer et al. have found that the more substituted terminus of the allyl piece will participate in new sigma bond formation regardless of the length of the internal carbon linkage.

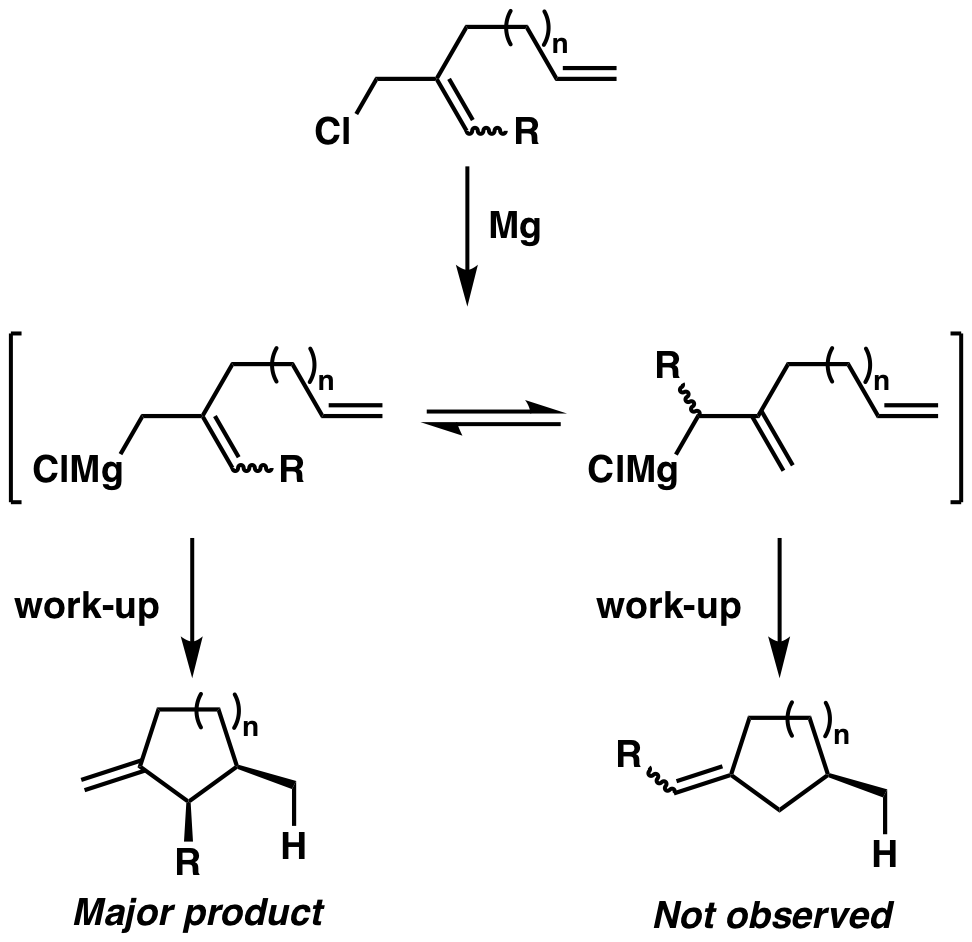

=== Stereoselectivity ===
Since a six-member cyclic transition state is involved in metallo-ene reaction, high level of stereoselectivity can be expected due to the conservation of orbital symmetry. Indeed, this happens to be the case in many synthetic applications of this reaction. Felkin et al. have found the cis product to be formed as the predominant product kinetically, while the trans product could also be obtained selectively under thermodynamic conditions. The fact that stereochemical outcome of this metallo-ene reaction could be tuned by altering the reaction conditions regardless of the geometry of allyl fragment reveals its reversible nature.

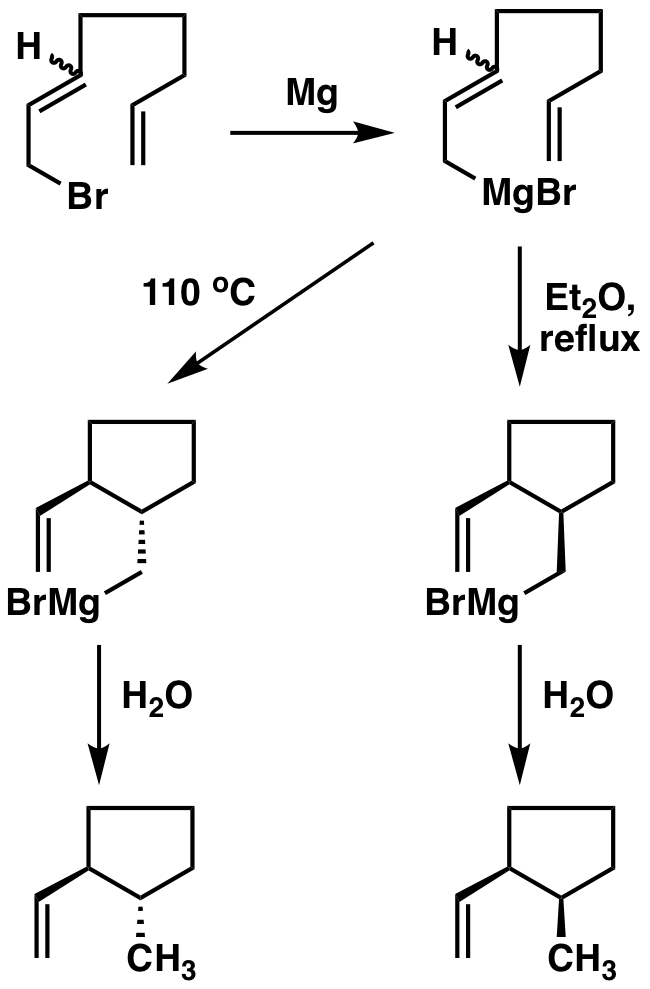

== Synthetic Application ==
=== Asymmetric synthesis ===
In 2016, Trost et al. have developed a highly diastero- and enantioselective intramolecular interrupted metallo-ene reaction using a chiral phosphoramidite ligand to achieve high levels of stereoselectivity. Starting from linear precursors, a wide range of vicinally disubstituted five-member rings could be synthesized. An additional stereocenter is generated during the process by reaction with water.

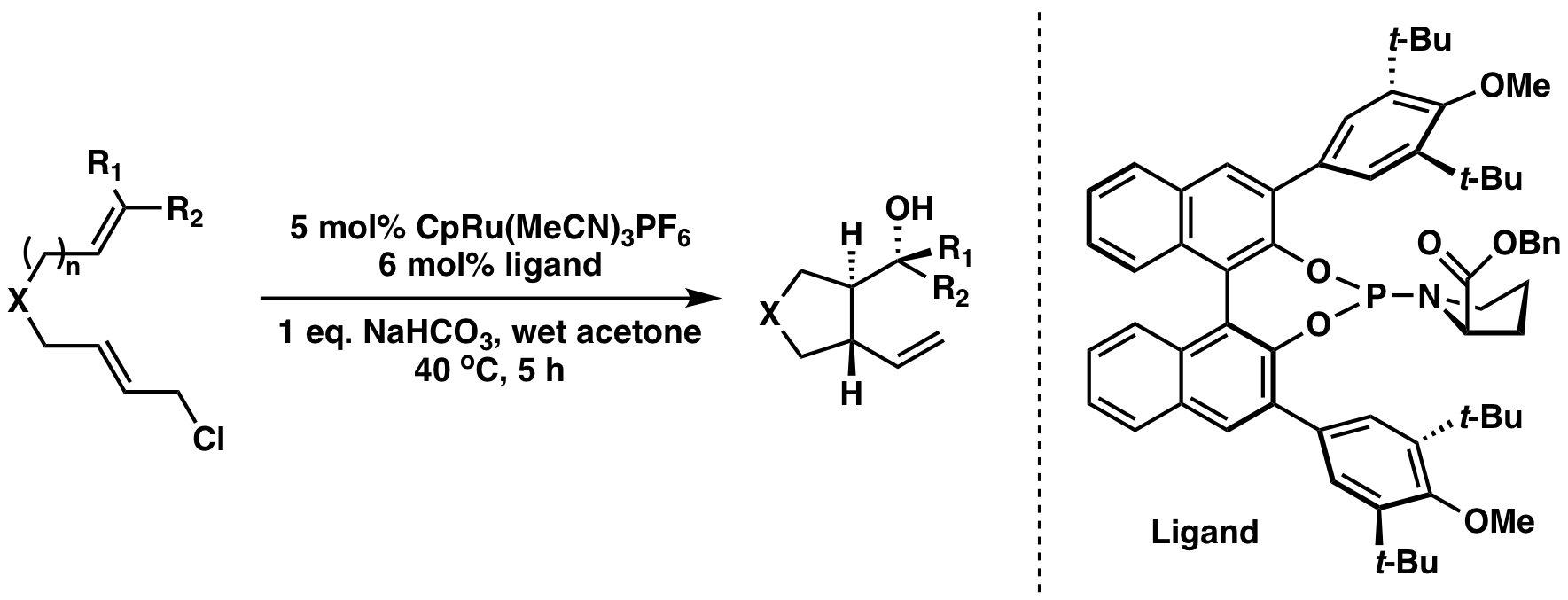

=== Sequential coupling ===
In 2017, Liu et al. have developed a highly efficient palladium- catalyzed cascade metallo-ene/Suzuki coupling reaction of allene-amides, delivering polyfunctionalized 2,3-dihydropyrrole derivatives in excellent yields.

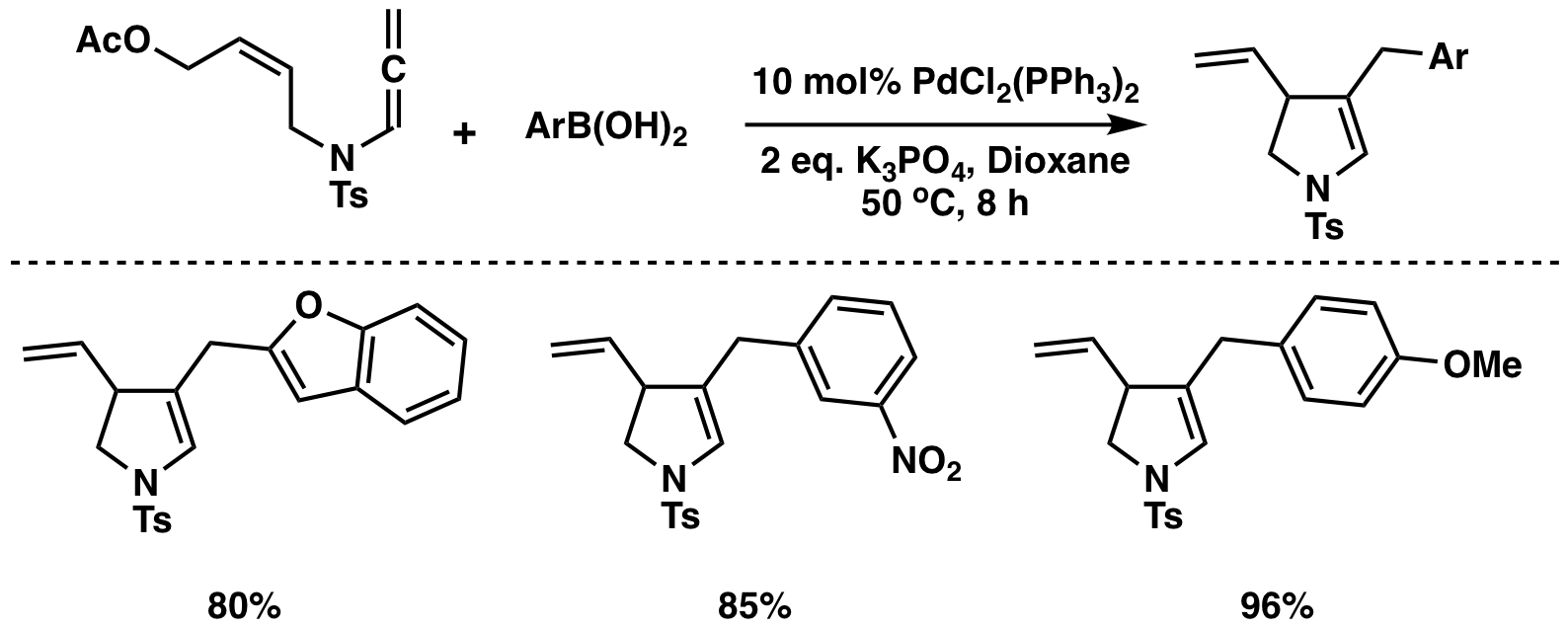

=== Total synthesis ===
In their synthetic efforts towards Coriolin, Oppolzer et al. devised a metallo-ene-carbonylation cascade reaction to construct the fused bicyclic core of Coriolin in an efficient fashion. They started with a simple aldehyde to which a propargyl alcohol appendage was attached via nucleophilic addition. Reduction followed by Appel reaction and Finkelstein reaction would yielded a key intermediate, which in the presence of nickel catalyst and CO atmosphere could be transformed to the target cyclopentanone in decent yield.

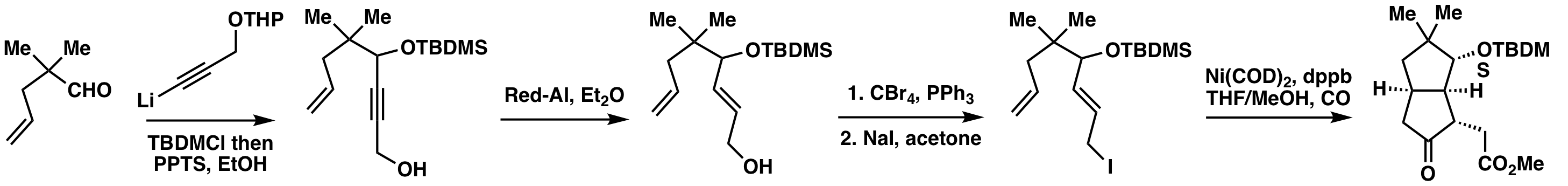
