= Zerewitinoff determination =

The Zerewitinoff determination or Zerevitinov determination is a quantitative chemical test for the determination of active hydrogens in a chemical substance developed by F. V. Tserevitinov (jointly with L. A. Chugaev ) in 1902-1907. A sample is treated with the Grignard reagent, methylmagnesium iodide, which reacts with any acidic hydrogen atom to form methane. This gas can be determined quantitatively by measuring its volume. For example:

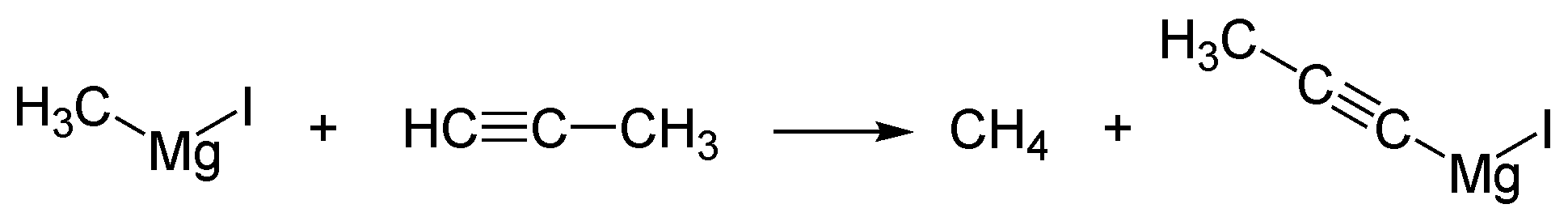
