= Phosphonium coupling =

In organic chemistry, phosphonium coupling is a cross-coupling reaction for organic synthesis. It is a mild, efficient, chemoselective and versatile methodology for the formation of C–C, C–N, C–O, and C–S bond of unactivated and unprotected tautomerizable heterocycles. The method was originally reported in 2004. The C–OH bond of a tautomerizable heterocycle is activated with a phosphonium salt (PyBroP, PyBOP, BroP, or BOP), and subsequent functionalization with either a nucleophile through SNAr displacement or an organometallic through transition metal catalyzed cross coupling reaction. The in situ activation of the C-OH bond in phosphonium coupling has been applied to cross coupling reactions of tautomerizable heterocycles and arenols using other types of activating reagents.

Phosphonium coupling generates in situ a pseudo aryl or heteroaryl halide (the intermediate phosphonium species), which subsequently reacts with its coupling partner.
