= Marschalk reaction =

The Marschalk reaction in chemistry is the sodium dithionite promoted reaction of a phenolic anthraquinone with an aldehyde to yield a substituted phenolic anthraquinone after the addition of acid.

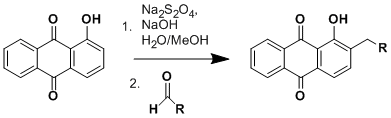

The mechanism can be found in the book Named Reactions in Organic Chemistry, and its more intuitive version is provided below:

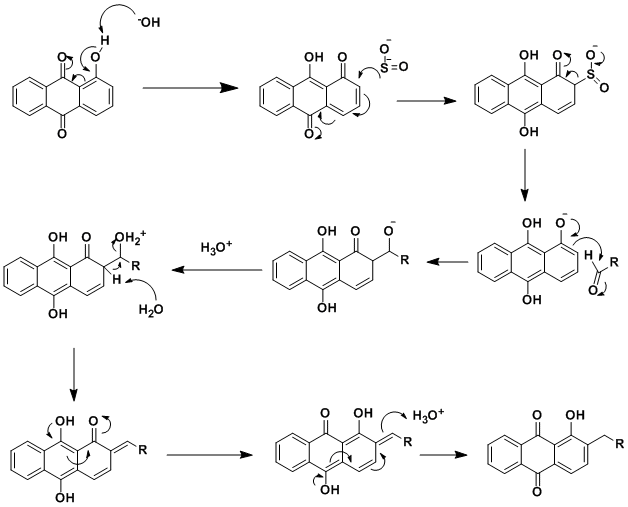

One of the first applications of this reaction was reported in 1985.
