= Sommelet reaction =

Chemical reaction

The Sommelet reaction is an organic reaction in which a benzyl halide is converted to an aldehyde by action of hexamine and water. It is named after the French chemist Marcel Sommelet, who first reported the reaction in 1913.

One example, thiophene-2-carboxaldehyde is prepared by the reaction of hexamine with 2-chloromethylthiophene. The reaction is formally an oxidation of the carbon.

== Reaction mechanism and scope ==
The benzyl halide 1 reacts with hexamine to a quaternary ammonium salt 3, each time just alkylating one nitrogen atom. Then the benzylammonium undergoes an acid-catalyzed hydrolysis process.

Depending on the hydrolysis conditions, the hexamine unit might instead break apart, leaving a benzyl amine (the Delépine reaction).

The reaction can also be applied to the oxidation of benzylic amines. In this way, m-xylylenediamine can be converted to isophthalaldehyde.
