= Carbylamine reaction =

Method of synthesizing an isocyanide

The carbylamine reaction (also known as the Hoffmann isocyanide synthesis) is the synthesis of an isocyanide by the reaction of a primary amine, chloroform, and base. The conversion involves the intermediacy of dichlorocarbene.

Illustrative is the synthesis of tert-butyl isocyanide from tert-butylamine in the presence of catalytic amount of the phase transfer catalyst benzyltriethylammonium chloride.

Me_{3}CNH_{2} + CHCl_{3} + 3 NaOH → Me_{3}CNC + 3 NaCl + 3 H_{2}O

Similar reactions have been reported for aniline. It is used to prepare secondary amines.

== Test for primary amines ==
As it is only effective for primary amines, the carbylamine reaction can be used as a chemical test for their presence. In this context, the reaction is also known as Saytzeff's isocyanide test. In this reaction, the analyte is heated with alcoholic potassium hydroxide and chloroform. If a primary amine is present, the isocyanide (carbylamine) is formed, as indicated by a foul odour. The carbylamine test does not give a positive reaction with secondary and tertiary amines.

== Mechanism ==
The mechanism involves the addition of amine to dichlorocarbene, a reactive intermediate generated by the dehydrohalogenation of chloroform. Two successive base-mediated dehydrochlorination steps result in formation of the isocyanide.

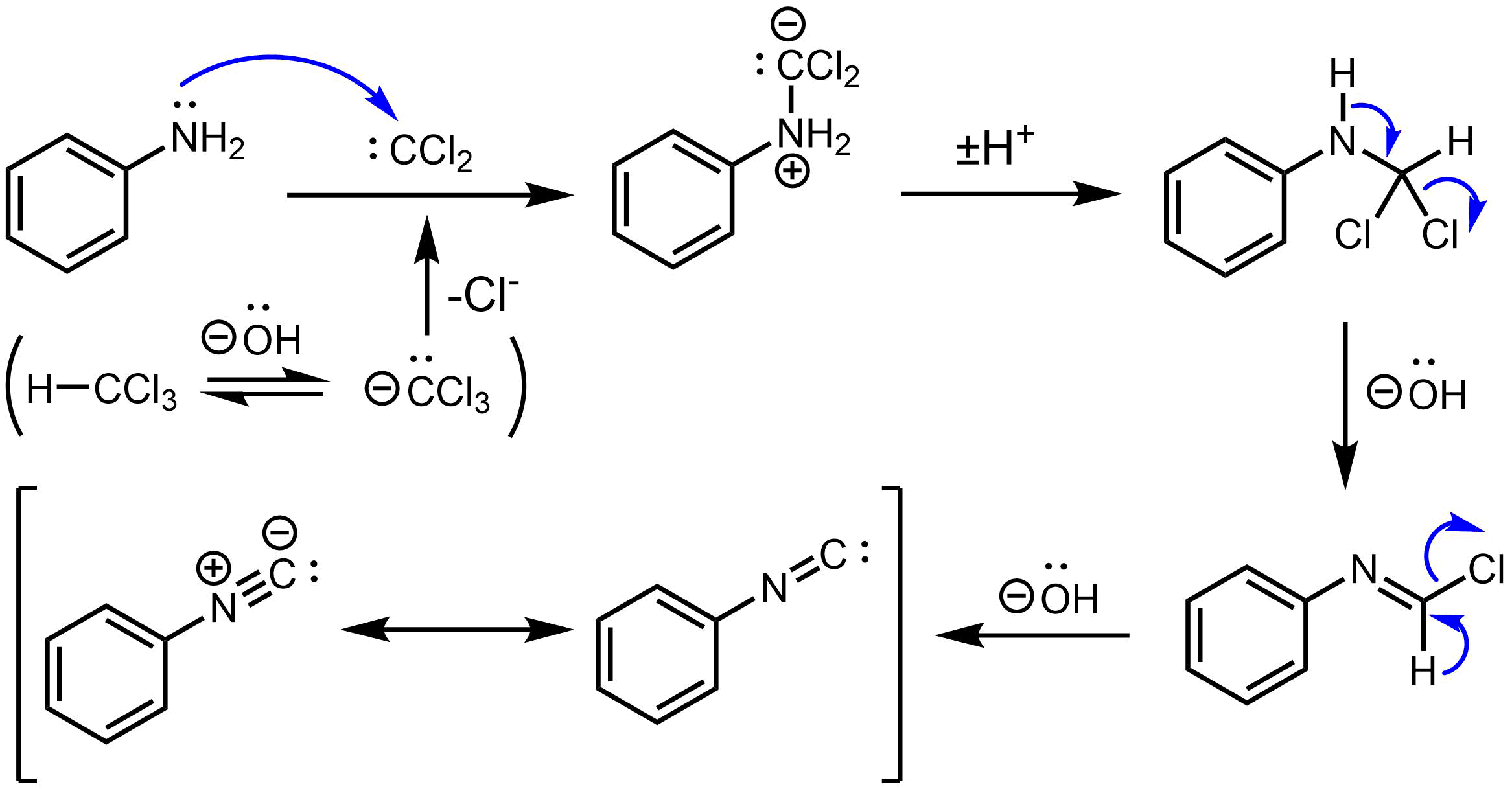

== See also ==
- Isodiazomethane
- Carbene
