= Benary reaction =

Organic reaction

The Benary reaction is an organic reaction. In 1931 Erich Bénary discovered that β-(N,N-dialkylamino)-vinyl ketones reacted with Grignard reagents in a 1,4-addition to give α,β-unsaturated ketones, α,β-unsaturated aldehydes and α,β-unsaturated esters as well as poly-unsaturated ketones and aldehydes after hydrolysis of the reaction intermediate and elimination of a dialkylated amine.
