= Wenker synthesis =

Chemical reaction

Named after	Henry Wenker
Reaction type	Ring forming reaction

Identifiers
Organic Chemistry Portal	wenker-synthesis

The Wenker synthesis is an organic reaction converting a beta amino alcohol to an aziridine with the help of sulfuric acid. It is used industrially for the synthesis of aziridine itself.

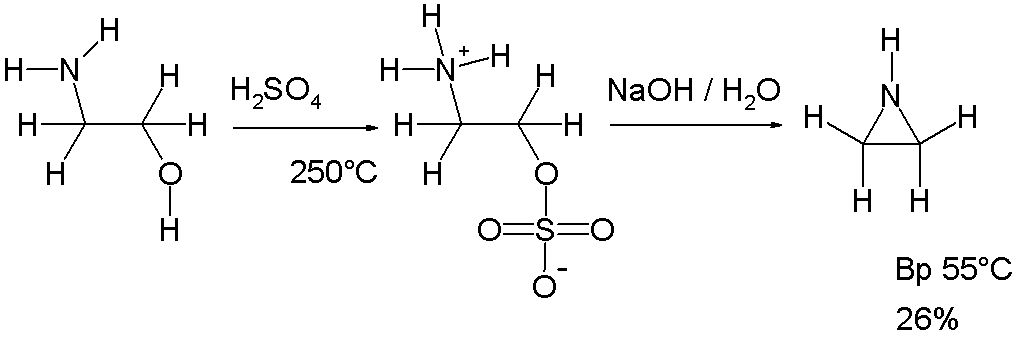
Wenker synthesis

The original Wenker synthesis of aziridine itself takes place in two steps. In the first step ethanolamine is reacted with sulfuric acid at high temperatures (250 °C) to form the sulfate monoester. This salt is then reacted with sodium hydroxide in the second step forming aziridine. The base abstracts an amine proton enabling it to displace the sulfate group. A modification of this reaction involving lower reaction temperatures (140–180 °C) and therefore reduced charring increases the yield of the intermediate.

The Wenker synthesis protocol using trans-2-aminocyclooctanol, available from reaction of ammonia with the epoxide of cyclooctene, gives a mixture of cyclooctenimine (the Wenker aziridine product) and cyclooctanone (a competing Hofmann elimination product).

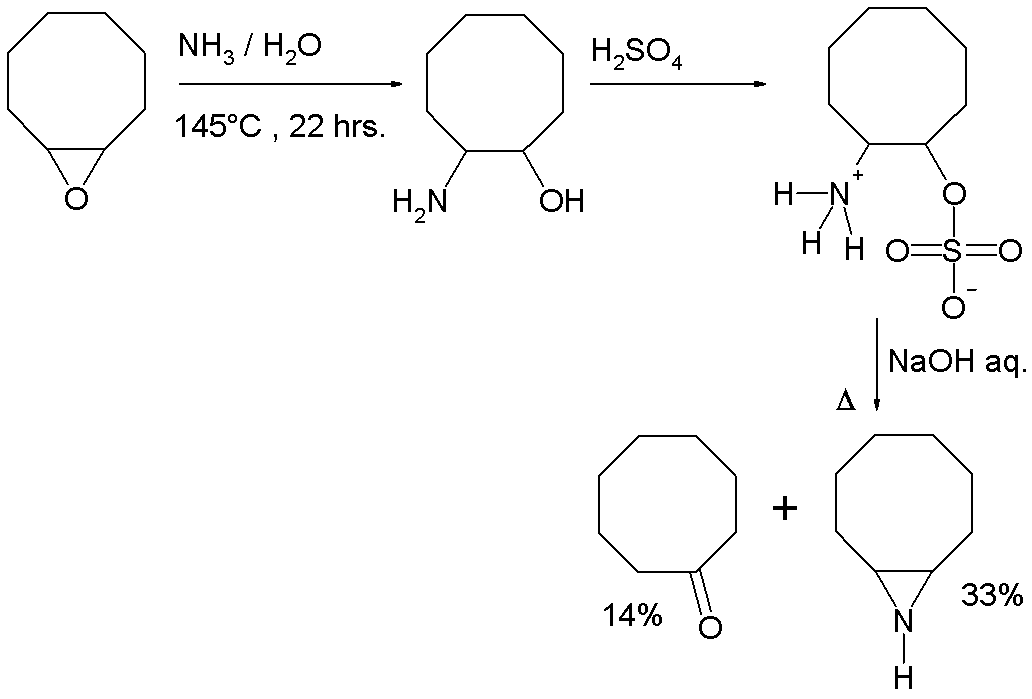
9-Azabicyclo[6.1.0]nonane synthesis
