= Forster–Decker method =

Series of chemical reactions

The Forster–Decker method is a series of chemical reactions that have the effect of mono-alkylating a primary amine (1), forming a secondary amine (6). The process occurs by way of transient formation of an imine (3) that undergoes the actual alkylation reaction.

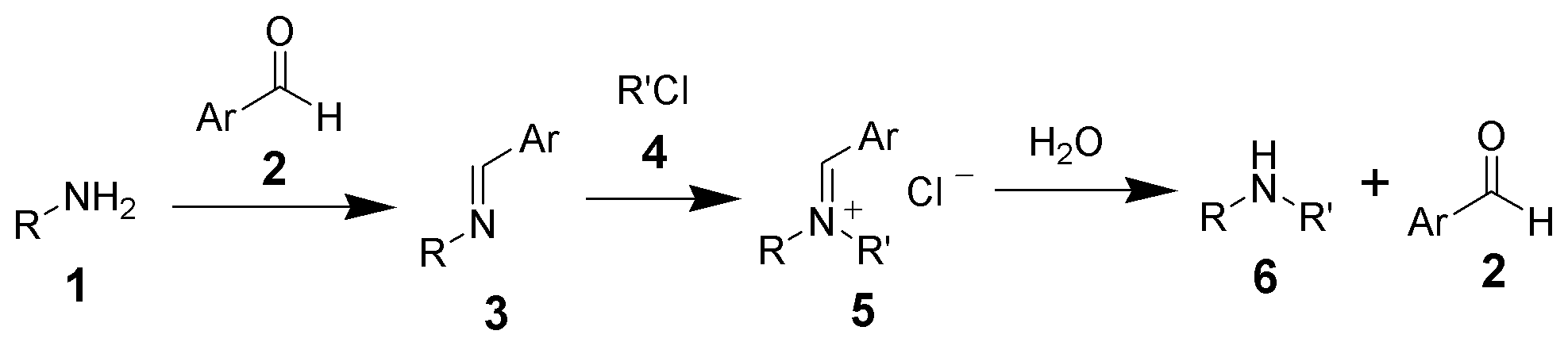
The Forster-Decker method

== Process stages ==
1. Conversion of the primary amine to an imine (Schiff base) using an aldehyde.
2. Alkylation of the imine using an alkyl halide, forming an iminium ion.
3. Hydrolysis of the iminium, releasing the secondary amine and regenerating the aldehyde.

Because the actual alkylation occurs on the imine, over-alkylation is not possible. Therefore, this method does not suffer from side-reactions such as formation of tertiary amines as a simple S_{N}2-type process can.

== See also ==
- Reductive amination
