= Hemetsberger indole synthesis =

Chemical reaction

Named after	Helfried Hemetsberger
Reaction type	Ring forming reaction

The Hemetsberger indole synthesis (also called the Hemetsberger–Knittel synthesis) is a chemical reaction that thermally decomposes a 3-aryl-2-azido-propenoic ester into an indole-2-carboxylic ester.

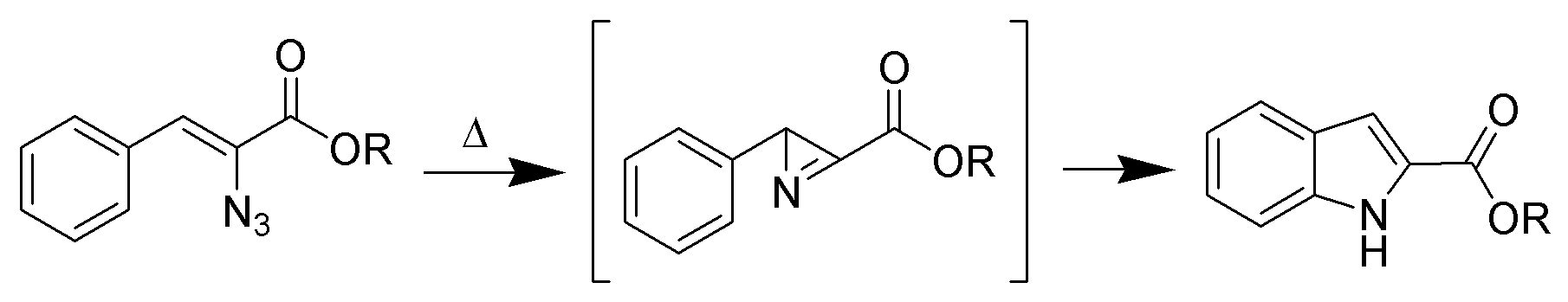
The Hemetsberger indole synthesis

Yields are typically above 70%. However, this is not a popular reaction, due to the lack of stability and difficulty in synthesizing the starting material.

== Reaction mechanism ==
The mechanism is unknown. However, azirine intermediates have been isolated. The mechanism is postulated to proceed via a nitrene intermediate.
