= Name reaction =

Chemical reaction named after its discoverers or developers

A name reaction (or named reaction) is a chemical reaction named after its discoverer(s) or developer(s). Among the tens of thousands of organic reactions that are known, hundreds of such reactions are typically identified by the eponym. Well-known examples include the Grignard reaction, the Sabatier reaction, the Wittig reaction, the Claisen condensation, the Friedel–Crafts acylation, and the Diels–Alder reaction. Books have been published devoted exclusively to name reactions; the Merck Index, a chemical encyclopedia, also includes an appendix on name reactions.

As organic chemistry developed during the 20th century, chemists started associating synthetically useful reactions with the names of their discoverers or developers. In many cases, the name is merely a mnemonic. Some reactions such as the Pummerer rearrangement, the Pinnick oxidation and the Birch reduction are named for people other than their discoverers, but this situation is not common.

Although systematic approaches for naming reactions based on the reaction mechanism or the overall transformation exist, such as the IUPAC nomenclature for organic chemical transformations, these technically-descriptive names are often unwieldy or not specific enough. Instead, reactions are identified by the names of people associated with them, as a practical method for efficient communication. The name reaction thus can encompass various levels of specificity.

The vast majority of name reactions are named for men. During much of the timeline of modern chemical discovery, women were either discouraged from pursuing science or their contributions were minimized, and therefore few reactions were associated with women. Notable exceptions include the Goldberg reaction and the Catellani reaction.

== See also ==
- List of organic reactions
