= (S)-limonene 6-monooxygenase =

Class of enzymes

Identifiers
- EC no.: 1.14.14.51
- CAS no.: 138066-93-0

Databases
- IntEnz: IntEnz view
- BRENDA: BRENDA entry
- ExPASy: NiceZyme view
- KEGG: KEGG entry
- MetaCyc: metabolic pathway
- PRIAM: profile
- PDB structures: RCSB PDB PDBe PDBsum
- Gene Ontology: AmiGO / QuickGO
Search
- PMC: articles
- PubMed: articles
- NCBI: proteins

(S)-limonene 6-monooxygenase (EC 1.14.14.51) is an enzyme that catalyzes the chemical reaction

(S)-limonene
+ NADPH + H^{+}
O_{2}
H_{2}O
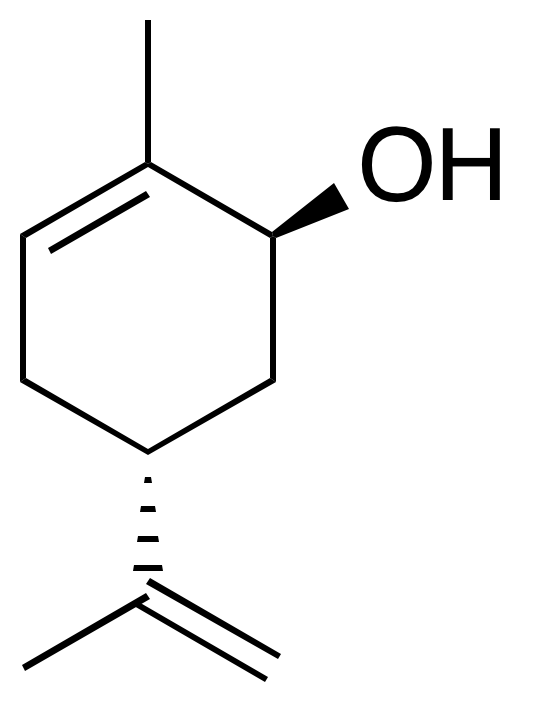
(−)-trans-carveol
+ NADP^{+}

The four substrates of this enzyme are (−)-(S)-limonene, reduced nicotinamide adenine dinucleotide phosphate (NADPH), oxygen and a proton. Its products are (−)-trans-carveol, oxidised NADP^{+}, and water.

This enzyme is a cytochrome P450 protein containing heme. This oxidoreductase, which uses molecular oxygen as oxidant is in a group with systematic name (S)-limonene,NADPH:oxygen oxidoreductase (6-hydroxylating). Other names in common use include (−)-limonene 6-hydroxylase, (−)-limonene 6-monooxygenase, and (−)-limonene,NADPH:oxygen oxidoreductase (6-hydroxylating). It is part of the biosynthetic pathway that leads to (−)-carvone, a compound giving spearmint its aroma.

== See also ==
- CYP2C19
- (R)-limonene 6-monooxygenase which converts the opposite enantiomer of limonene to (+)-trans-carveol
