= (+)-trans-carveol dehydrogenase =

Class of enzymes

Identifiers
- EC no.: 1.1.1.275

Databases
- IntEnz: IntEnz view
- BRENDA: BRENDA entry
- ExPASy: NiceZyme view
- KEGG: KEGG entry
- MetaCyc: metabolic pathway
- PRIAM: profile
- PDB structures: RCSB PDB PDBe PDBsum
- Gene Ontology: AmiGO / QuickGO
Search
- PMC: articles
- PubMed: articles
- NCBI: proteins

In enzymology, (+)-trans-carveol dehydrogenase (EC 1.1.1.275) is an enzyme that catalyzes the chemical reaction

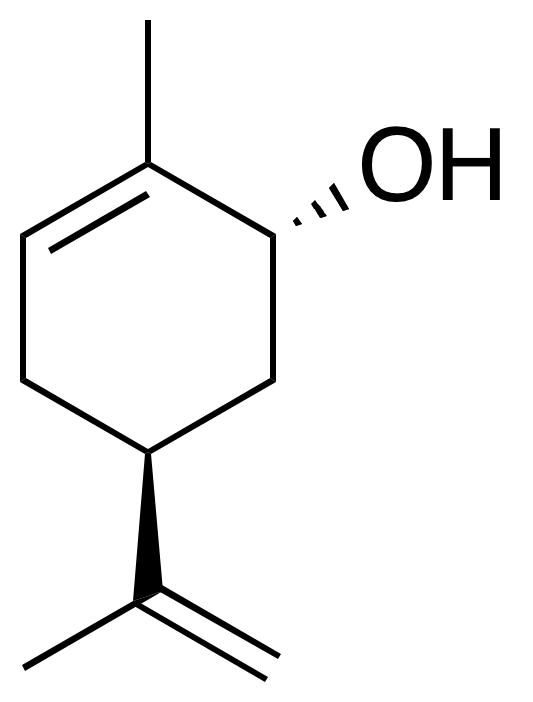
(+)-trans-carveol
+ NAD^{+}
H^{+}
H^{+}
(+)-carvone
+ NADH

The two substrates of this enzyme are (+)-trans-carveol and oxidised nicotinamide adenine dinucleotide (NAD^{+}). Its products are (+)-carvone, reduced NADH, and a proton.

This enzyme belongs to the family of oxidoreductases, specifically those acting on the CH-OH group of donor with NAD^{+} or NADP^{+} as acceptor. The systematic name of this enzyme class is (+)-trans-carveol:NAD^{+} oxidoreductase. This enzyme is also called carveol dehydrogenase. This enzyme participates in monoterpenoid biosynthesis and the degradation of the terpenes limonene and pinene.
