= Saegusa–Ito oxidation =

Chemical reaction in organic chemistry

The Saegusa–Ito oxidation is a chemical reaction used in organic chemistry. It was discovered in 1978 by Takeo Saegusa and Yoshihiko Ito as a method to introduce α-β unsaturation in carbonyl compounds. The reaction as originally reported involved formation of a silyl enol ether followed by treatment with palladium(II) acetate and benzoquinone to yield the corresponding enone. The original publication noted its utility for regeneration of unsaturation following 1,4-addition with nucleophiles such as organocuprates.

Saegusa-Ito oxidation

For acyclic substrates the reaction yields the thermodynamic E-olefin product exclusively.

Acyclic substrates

This discovery was preceded nearly eight years earlier by a report that treatment of unactivated ketones with palladium acetate yielded the same products in low yields. The major improvement provided by Saegusa and Ito was the recognition that the enol form was the reactive species, developing a method based on silyl enol ethers.

Benzoquinone is used as a sacrificial oxidant to regenerate palladium(II) from its reduced form palladium(0), so that a smaller amount of expensive palladium(II) acetate is required at the beginning. The reaction conditions and purifications could be simplified by using excess palladium(II) acetate without benzoquinone. Since the reaction typically employs near-stoichiometric amounts of palladium and is therefore often considered too expensive for industrial usage, some progress has been made in the development of catalytic variants. Despite this shortcoming, the Saegusa oxidation has been used in a number of syntheses as a mild, late-stage method for introduction of functionality in complex molecules.

== Mechanism ==
The mechanism of the Saegusa–Ito oxidation involves coordination of palladium to the enol olefin followed by loss of the silyl group and formation of an oxoallyl-palladium complex. β-hydride elimination yields the palladium hydride enone complex which upon reductive elimination yields the product along with acetic acid and Pd^{0}. The reversibility of the elimination step allows equilibration, leading to the thermodynamic E-selectivity in acyclic substrates. It has been shown that the product can form a stable Pd^{0}-olefin complex, which may be responsible for the difficulty with re-oxidation seen in catalytic variants of the reaction.

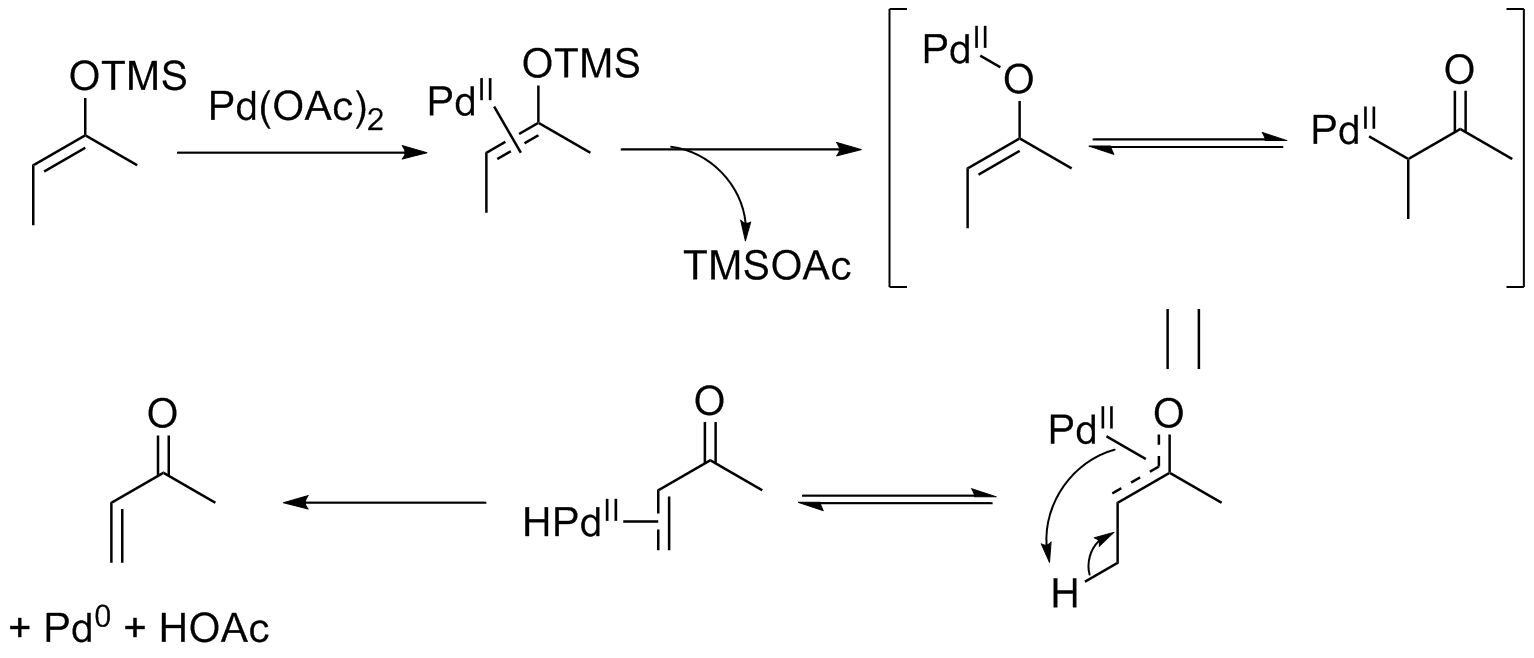
Mechanism of Saegusa oxidation. Ligated acetate groups are omitted for clarity.

== Scope ==
The wide applicability of the Saegusa–Ito oxidation is exemplified by its use in several classic syntheses of complex molecules. The synthesis of morphine by Tohru Fukuyama in 2006 is one such example, in which the transformation tolerates the presence of carbamate and ether substituents.

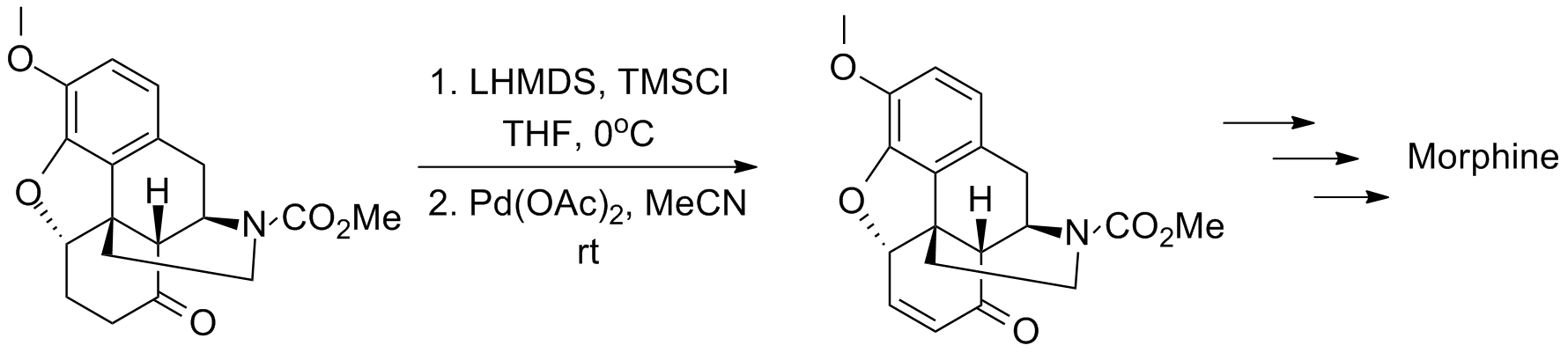
Fukuyama Synthesis of Morphine

Samuel J. Danishefsky's synthesis of both (+) and (-) peribysin began with a Saegusa–Ito oxidation of the Diels-Alder adduct of carvone and 3-trimethylsilyloxy-1,3-butadiene to yield the enone below. In this case the oxidation tolerated the presence of alkene and carbonyl moieties.

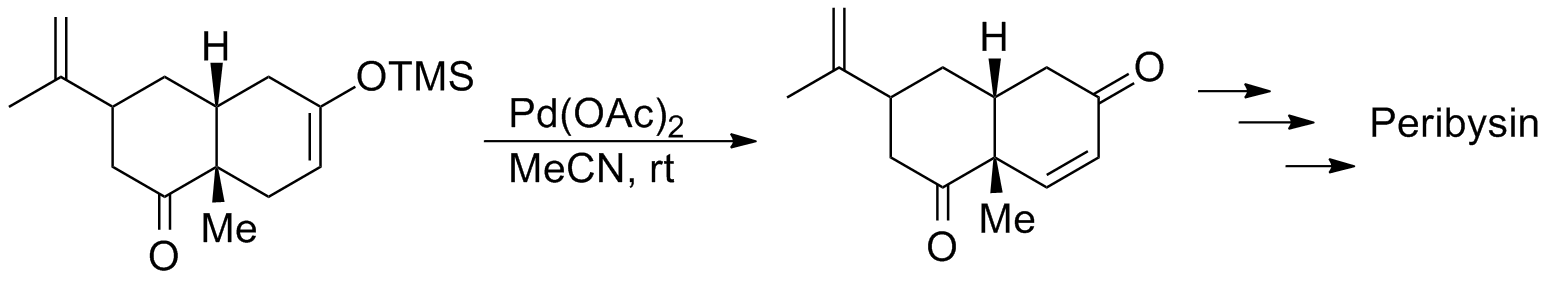
Danishefsky synthesis of peribysin

Yong Qiang Tu's synthesis of the Alzheimer's disease medication galantamine likewise used this reaction in the presence of an acid-sensitive acetal group.

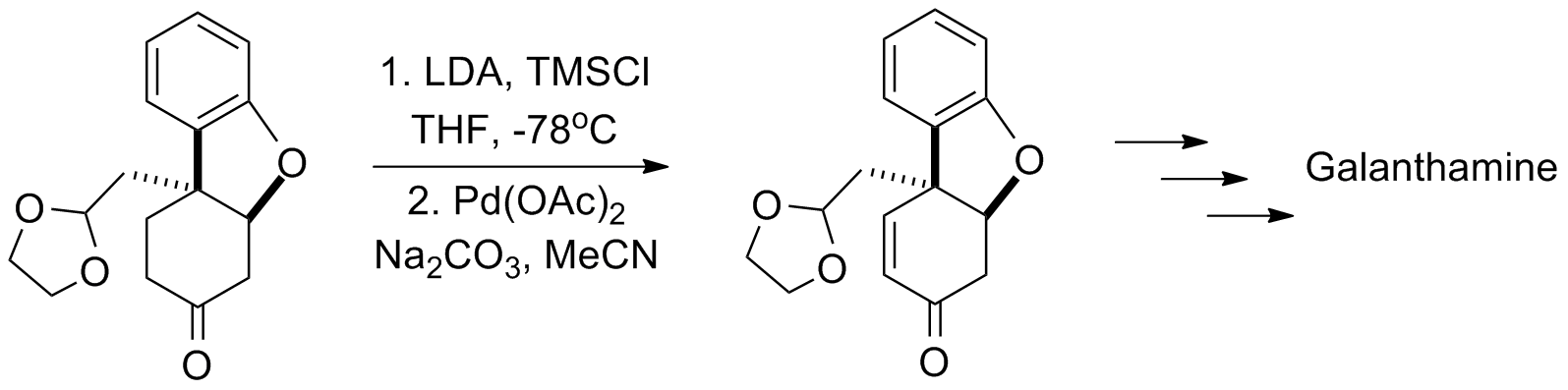
Tu synthesis of galantamine

Larry E. Overman's synthesis of laurenyne utilizes a one-pot oxidation with pyridinium chlorochromate followed by a Saegusa oxidation, tolerating the presence of a halogen and a sulfonate.

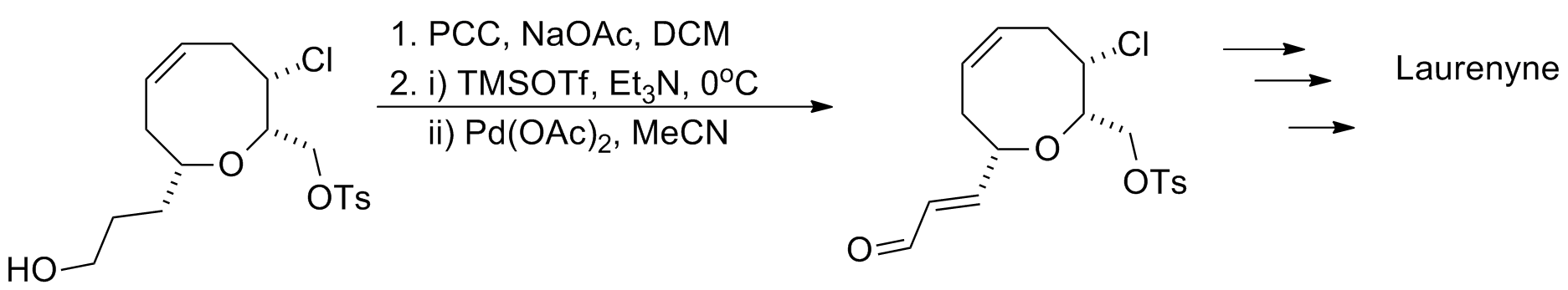
Overman synthesis of laurenyne

The synthesis of sambutoxin reported by David Williams uses a novel Saegusa–Ito oxidation involving an unprotected enol moiety. The enone product cyclized in situ to regenerate the enol and form the tetrahydropyran ring. Subsequent deprotection of the methoxymethyl group furnished the natural product.

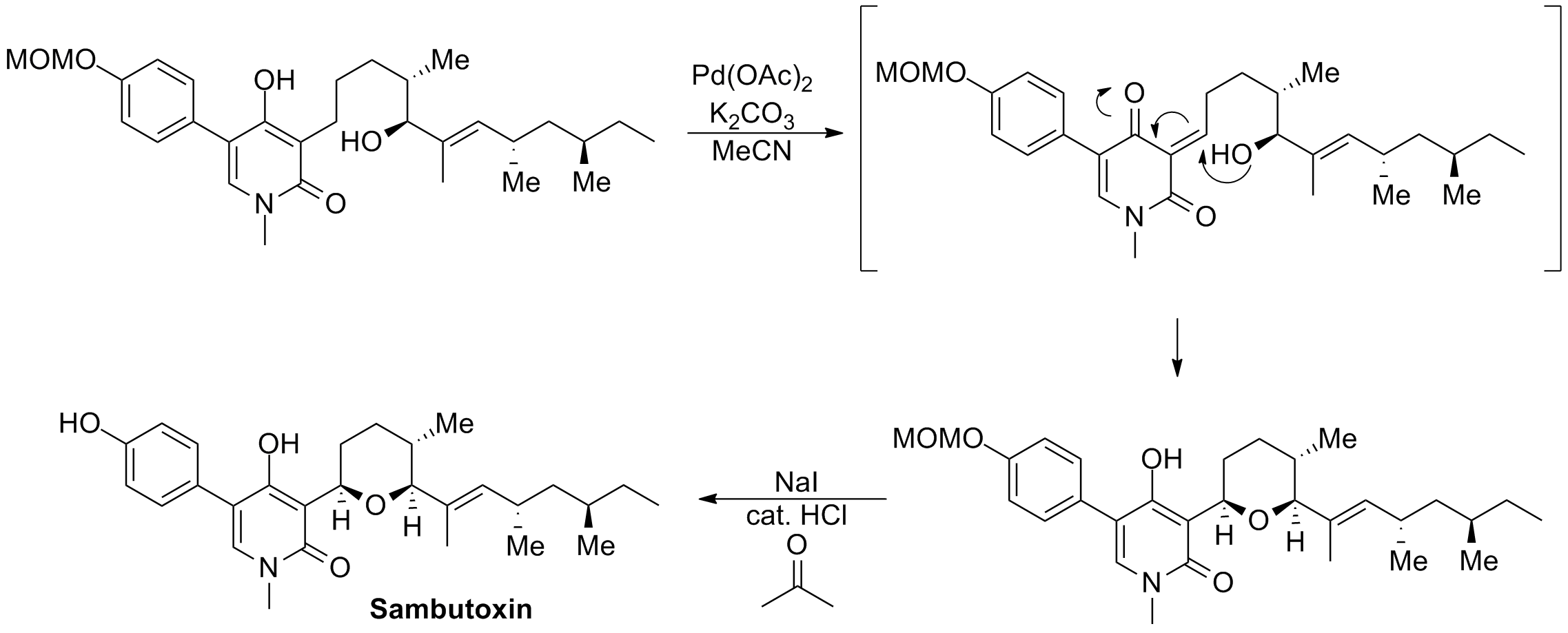
Williams sambutoxin synthesis

== Variations ==
The vast majority of improvements to this reaction have focused on rendering the transformation catalytic with respect to the palladium salt, primarily due to its high cost. The original conditions, though technically catalytic, still require 50 mol% of palladium(II) acetate, raising the cost to prohibitively high levels for large scale syntheses.

The major advances in catalytic versions of this reaction have steered towards co-oxidants that regenerate the palladium(II) species effectively. Specifically, conditions using atmospheric oxygen as well as stoichiometric allylcarbonate have been developed.

With respect to the former, the method developed by Larock in 1995 represents an environmentally and cost-attractive method as a catalytic substitute for the Saegusa–Ito oxidation.

Catalytic Saegusa–Ito oxidation utilizing oxygen as a co-oxidant

This method suffers from long reaction times and often produces significantly lower yields than the stoichiometric equivalent as showcased in the synthesis of platyphillide by Nishida. The contrast of the two methods highlights the catalytic method's shortcomings.

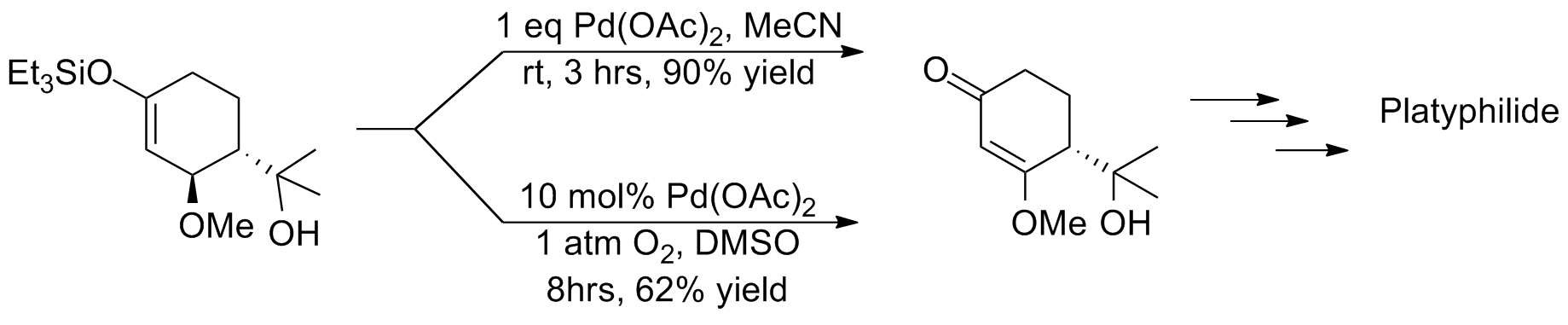
Synthesis of platyphillide

Catalytic variants employing stoichiometric diallylcarbonate and other allylic carbonates have also been developed, primarily by Jiro Tsuji. For these the choice of solvent is essential: nitrile solvents produce the desired enones while ethereal solvents produce α-allylketones instead.

Catalytic Saegusa–Ito oxidation using diallylcarbonate as a co-oxidant

This latter method has enjoyed greater success as a synthetic tool, most notably in the Shibasaki total synthesis of the famous poison strychnine.

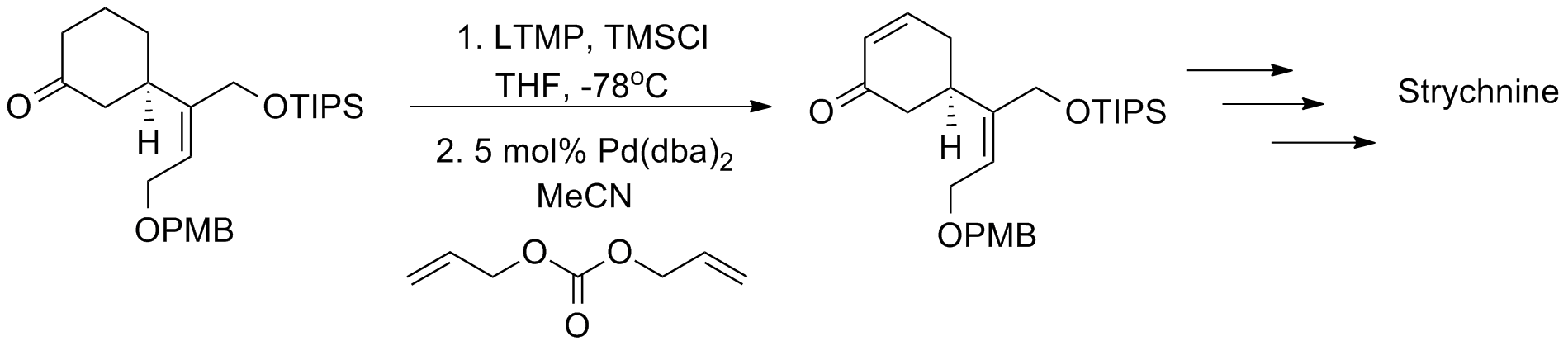
Shibasaki synthesis of strychnine

Despite these methods, much work remains to be done with regard to catalytic installation of α-β unsaturation.

== See also ==
- Silyl enol ether
- Palladium(II) acetate
- Selenoxide elimination
- Galantamine total synthesis
- Strychnine total synthesis
- 2-Iodoxybenzoic acid § α-Hydroxylations
