= Carveol dehydrogenase =

Enzyme

carveol dehydrogenase

Identifiers
- EC no.: 1.1.1.243
- CAS no.: 122653-66-1

Databases
- IntEnz: IntEnz view
- BRENDA: BRENDA entry
- ExPASy: NiceZyme view
- KEGG: KEGG entry
- MetaCyc: metabolic pathway
- PRIAM: profile
- PDB structures: RCSB PDB PDBe PDBsum
- Gene Ontology: AmiGO / QuickGO
Search
- PMC: articles
- PubMed: articles
- NCBI: proteins

In enzymology, a carveol dehydrogenase (EC 1.1.1.243) is an enzyme that catalyzes the chemical reaction

(-)-trans-carveol + NADP^{+} $\rightleftharpoons$ (-)-carvone + NADPH + H^{+}

Thus, the two substrates of this enzyme are (-)-trans-carveol and NADP^{+}, whereas its 3 products are (-)-carvone, NADPH, and H^{+}.

This enzyme belongs to the family of oxidoreductases, specifically those acting on the CH-OH group of donor with NAD^{+} or NADP^{+} as acceptor. The systematic name of this enzyme class is (-)-trans-carveol:NADP^{+} oxidoreductase. This enzyme is also called (-)-trans-carveol dehydrogenase. This enzyme participates in monoterpenoid biosynthesis and limonene and pinene degradation.
