= (R)-limonene 6-monooxygenase =

Class of enzymes

Identifiers
- EC no.: 1.14.14.53
- CAS no.: 221461-49-0

Databases
- IntEnz: IntEnz view
- BRENDA: BRENDA entry
- ExPASy: NiceZyme view
- KEGG: KEGG entry
- MetaCyc: metabolic pathway
- PRIAM: profile
- PDB structures: RCSB PDB PDBe PDBsum
Search
- PMC: articles
- PubMed: articles
- NCBI: proteins

(R)-limonene 6-monooxygenase (EC 1.14.14.53) is an enzyme that catalyzes the chemical reaction

(R)-limonene
+ NADPH + H^{+}
O_{2}
H_{2}O
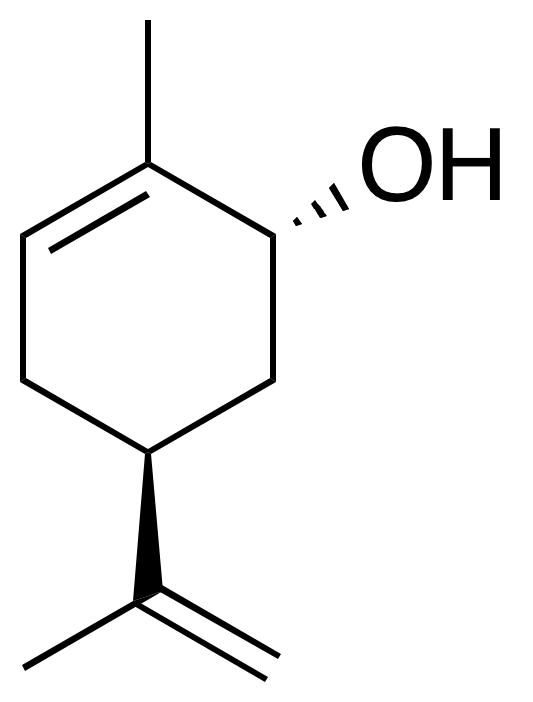
(+)-trans-carveol
+ NADP^{+}

The four substrates of this enzyme are (+)-(R)-limonene, reduced nicotinamide adenine dinucleotide phosphate (NADPH), oxygen, and a proton. Its products are (+)-trans-carveol, oxidised NADP^{+}, and water. This enzyme is a cytochrome P450 protein containing heme. This oxidoreductase, which uses molecular oxygen as oxidant, is in a group with systematic name (R)-limonene,NADPH:oxygen oxidoreductase (6-hydroxylating). Other names in common use include (+)-limonene-6-hydroxylase, and (+)-limonene 6-monooxygenase. It is part of the biosynthesis pathway to (+)-carvone in caraway.

== See also ==
- CYP2C19
- (S)-limonene 6-monooxygenase which converts the opposite enantiomer of limonene to (–)-trans-carveol
