= Carvonic acid =

Names
- IUPAC name 2-(4-Methyl-5-oxo-cyclohex-3-enyl)-acrylic acid

Identifiers
CAS Number	362483-06-5 (racemate)
3D model (JSmol)	(R): Interactive image; (S): Interactive image
ChemSpider	27330306 (R); 27330305 (S)
PubChem CID	71308172
UNII	JC3J3QY22C
CompTox Dashboard (EPA)	DTXSID10745430
- InChI: InChI=1S/C10H12O3/c1-6-3-4-8(5-9(6)11)7(2)10(12)13/h3,8H,2,4-5H2,1H3,(H,12,13)/t8-/m1/s1 Key: BPJKNHQCPHBIAR-MRVPVSSYSA-N; (S): InChI=1S/C10H12O3/c1-6-3-4-8(5-9(6)11)7(2)10(12)13/h3,8H,2,4-5H2,1H3,(H,12,13)/t8-/m0/s1 Key: BPJKNHQCPHBIAR-QMMMGPOBSA-N
- SMILES: (R): CC1=CC[C@H](CC1=O)C(=C)C(=O)O; (S): CC1=CC[C@@H](CC1=O)C(=C)C(=O)O

Properties
Chemical formula	C_{10}H_{12}O_{3}
Molar mass	180.20 g/mol
- Except where otherwise noted, data are given for materials in their standard state (at 25 °C [77 °F], 100 kPa). verify (what is ?) Infobox references

Carvonic acid, or α-methylene-4-methyl-5-oxo-3-cyclohexene-1-acetic acid, is a terpenoid formed by metabolism of carvone in humans.
