= Yoshihiko Ito (chemist) =

Japanese chemist

- Born: December 16, 1937; Osaka, Japan
- Died: December 23, 2006 (aged 69)
- Education: Kyoto University
- Known for: Saegusa-Ito oxidation
- Scientific career
- Fields: Chemistry
- Workplaces: Kyoto University
- Doctoral advisor: Ryōhei Oda

Yoshihiko Ito (伊藤 嘉彦, Itō Yoshihiko; December 16, 1937 – December 23, 2006) was a Japanese chemist.
