= 2-alkenal reductase =

Class of enzymes

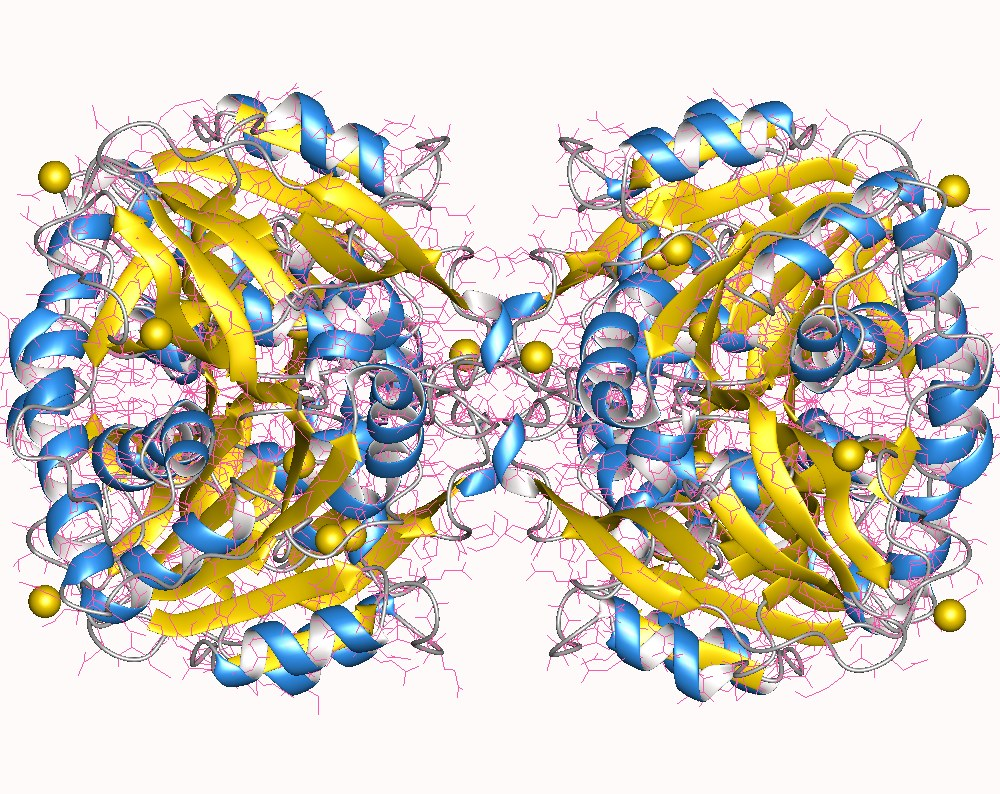
- Leukotriene B4 12-hydroxydehydrogenase (NADP-dependent) dimer, Human

Identifiers
- EC no.: 1.3.1.74
- CAS no.: 9032-20-6

Databases
- IntEnz: IntEnz view
- BRENDA: BRENDA entry
- ExPASy: NiceZyme view
- KEGG: KEGG entry
- MetaCyc: metabolic pathway
- PRIAM: profile
- PDB structures: RCSB PDB PDBe PDBsum
- Gene Ontology: AmiGO / QuickGO
Search
- PMC: articles
- PubMed: articles
- NCBI: proteins

In enzymology, a 2-alkenal reductase (EC 1.3.1.74) is an enzyme that catalyzes the chemical reaction

n-alkanal + NAD(P)+ $\rightleftharpoons$ alk-2-enal + NAD(P)H + H^{+}

The three substrates of this enzyme are n-alkanal, NAD^{+}, and NADP^{+}, whereas its four products are alk-2-enal, NADH, NADPH, and H^{+}.

This enzyme belongs to the family of oxidoreductases, specifically those acting on the CH-CH group of donor with NAD+ or NADP+ as acceptor. The systematic name of this enzyme class is n-alkanal:NAD(P)+ 2-oxidoreductase. Other names in common use include NAD(P)H-dependent alkenal/one oxidoreductase, and NADPH:2-alkenal alpha,beta-hydrogenase.

== Structural studies ==
As of late 2007, three structures have been solved for this class of enzymes, with PDB accession codes 2DM6, 2J3J, and 2J3K.
