= Silyl enol ether =

Class of organosilicon compounds of the form R3Si–O–CR=CR2

The general structure of a silyl enol ether

In organosilicon chemistry, silyl enol ethers are a class of organic compounds that share the common functional group R_{3}Si−O−CR=CR_{2}, composed of an enolate (R_{3}C−O−R) bonded to a silane (SiR_{4}) through its oxygen end and an ethene group (R_{2}C=CR_{2}) as its carbon end. They are important intermediates in organic synthesis.

== Synthesis ==
Silyl enol ethers are generally prepared by reacting an enolizable carbonyl compound with a silyl electrophile and a base, or just reacting an enolate with a silyl electrophile. Since silyl electrophiles are hard and silicon-oxygen bonds are very strong, the oxygen (of the carbonyl compound or enolate) acts as the nucleophile to form a Si-O single bond.

The most commonly used silyl electrophile is trimethylsilyl chloride. To increase the rate of reaction, trimethylsilyl triflate may also be used in the place of trimethylsilyl chloride as a more electrophilic substrate.

When using an unsymmetrical enolizable carbonyl compound as a substrate, the choice of reaction conditions can help control whether the kinetic or thermodynamic silyl enol ether is preferentially formed. For instance, when using lithium diisopropylamide (LDA), a strong and sterically hindered base, at low temperature (e.g., −78°C), the kinetic silyl enol ether (with a less substituted double bond) preferentially forms due to sterics. When using triethylamine, a weak base, the thermodynamic silyl enol ether (with a more substituted double bond) is preferred.

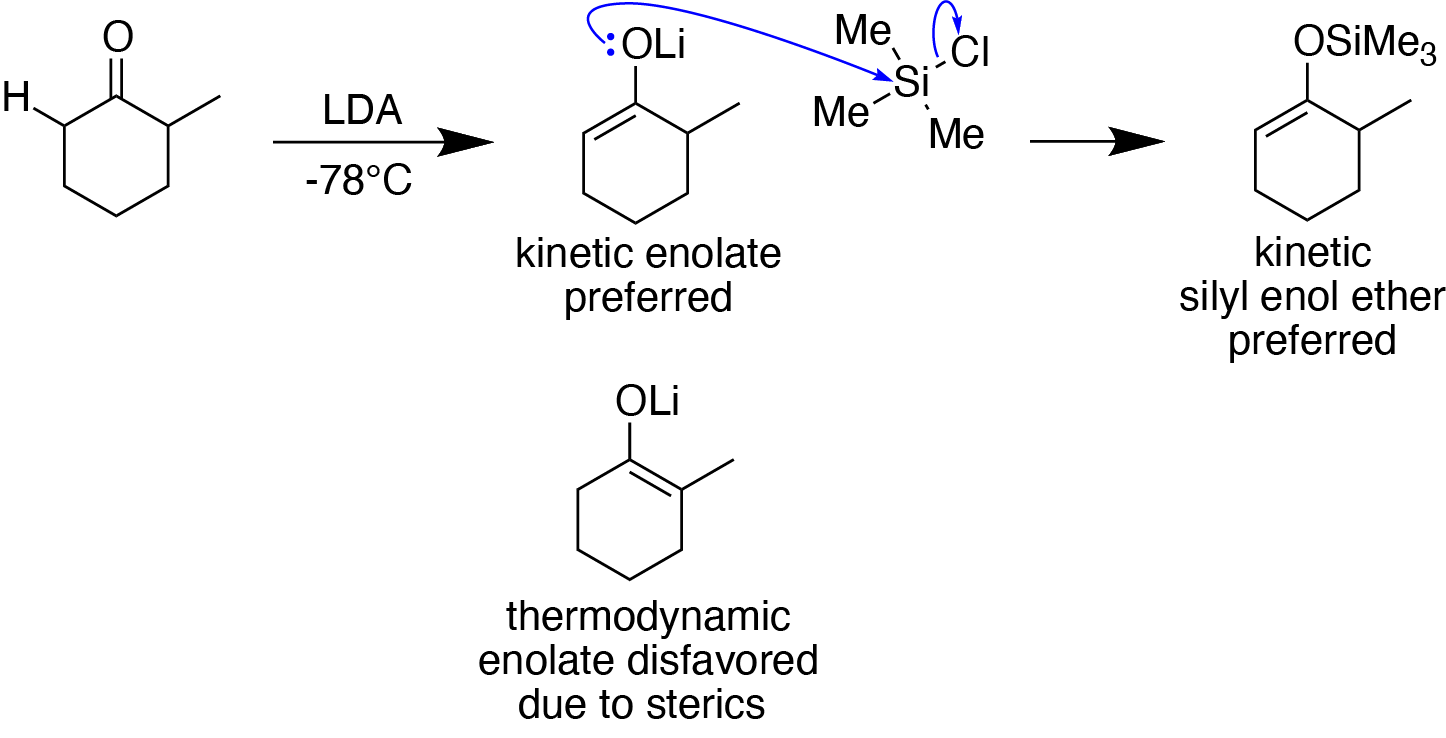
Example synthesis of a kinetic silyl enol ether by reacting an unsymmetrical ketone with trimethylsilyl chloride and LDA at low temperature.

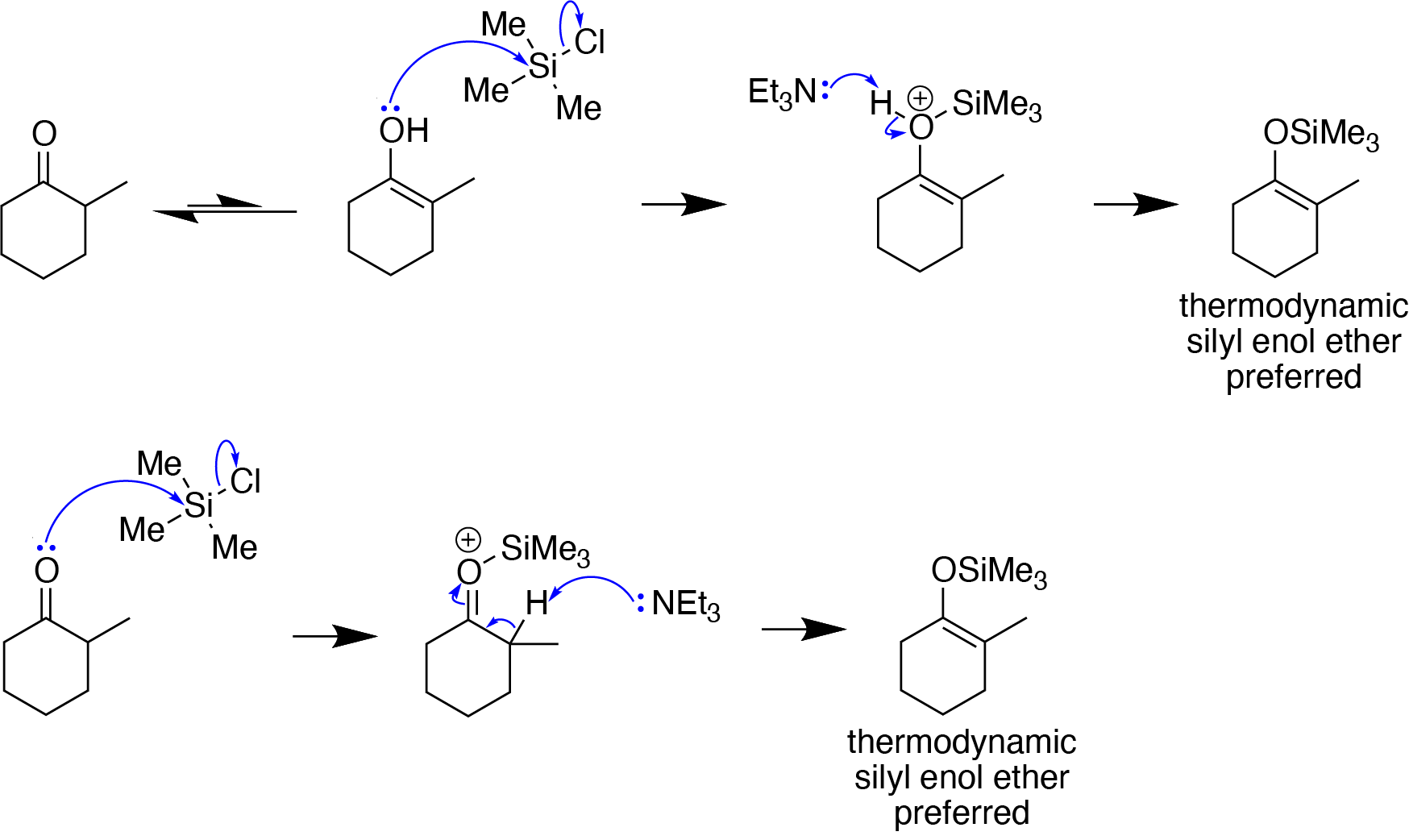
Example synthesis of a thermodynamic silyl enol ether by reacting an unsymmetrical ketone with trimethylsilyl chloride and triethylamine. Two possible mechanisms are shown.

Alternatively, a rather exotic way of generating silyl enol ethers is via the Brook rearrangement of appropriate substrates.

== Reactions ==
=== General reaction profile ===
Silyl enol ethers are neutral, mild nucleophiles (milder than enamines) that react with good electrophiles such as aldehydes (with Lewis acid catalysis) and carbocations. Silyl enol ethers are stable enough to be isolated, but are usually used immediately after synthesis.

=== Generation of lithium enolate ===
Lithium enolates, one of the precursors to silyl enol ethers, can also be generated from silyl enol ethers using methyllithium. The reaction occurs via nucleophilic substitution at the silicon of the silyl enol ether, producing the lithium enolate and tetramethylsilane.

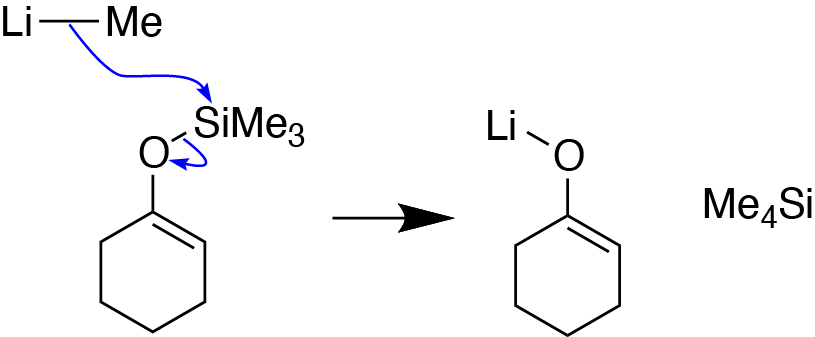
Generation of a lithium enolate from a silyl enol ether, using methyllithium.

=== C–C bond formation ===
Silyl enol ethers are used in many reactions resulting in alkylation, e.g., Mukaiyama aldol addition, Michael reactions, and Lewis-acid-catalyzed reactions with S_{N}1-reactive electrophiles (e.g., tertiary, allylic, or benzylic alkyl halides). Alkylation of silyl enol ethers is especially efficient with tertiary alkyl halides, which form stable carbocations in the presence of Lewis acids like TiCl_{4} or SnCl_{4}.

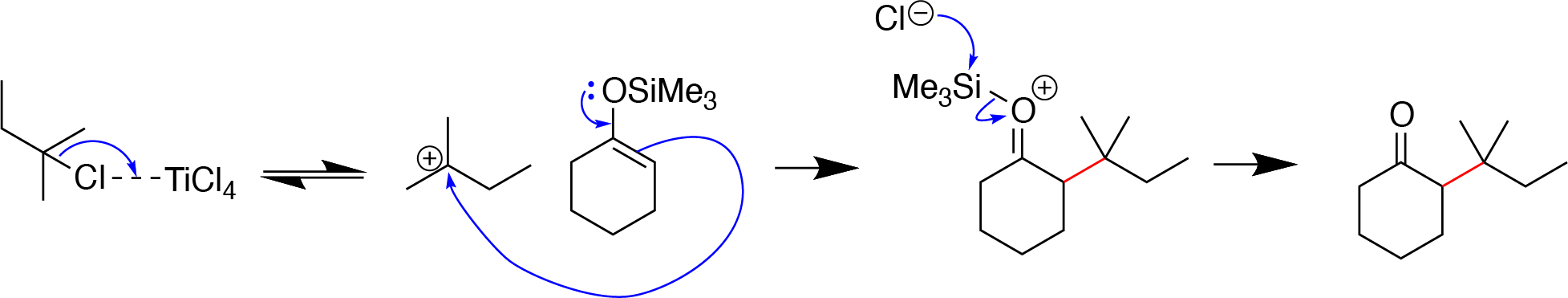
Example alkylation of a silyl enol ether using a tertiary alkyl halide in the presence of the Lewis acid TiCl_{4}.

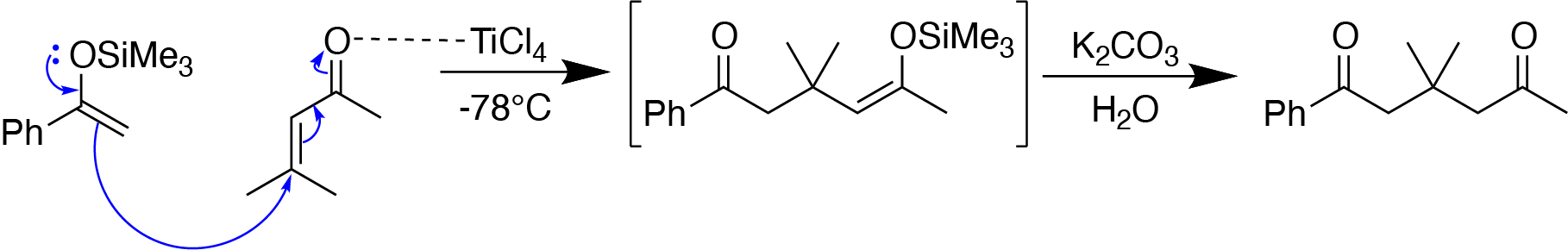
Example Michael reaction using a disubstituted enone and the silyl enol ether of acetophenone, catalyzed by the Lewis acid TiCl_{4} at low temperature.

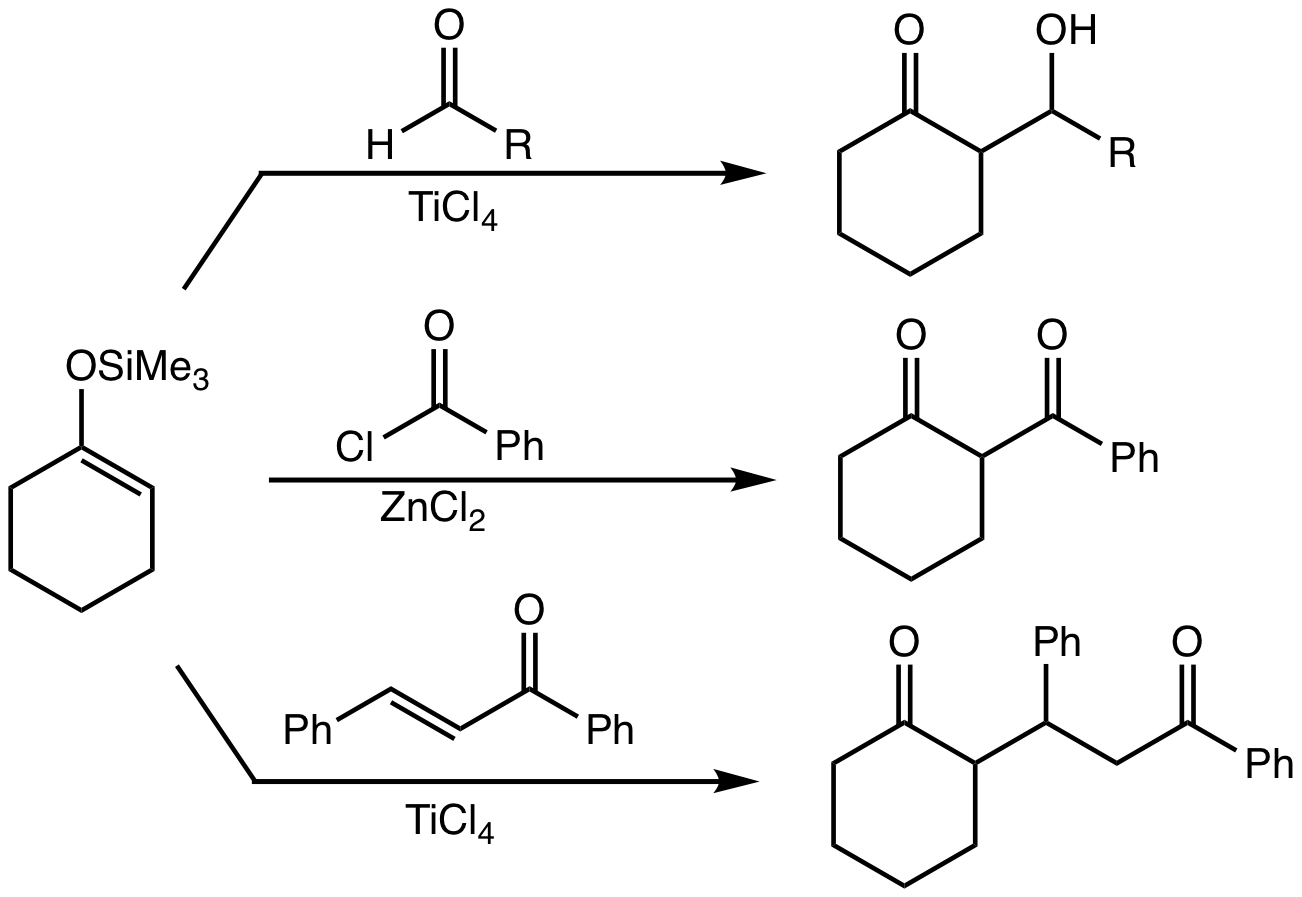
More example reactions of silyl enol ethers.

=== Halogenation and oxidations ===
Halogenation of silyl enol ethers gives haloketones.

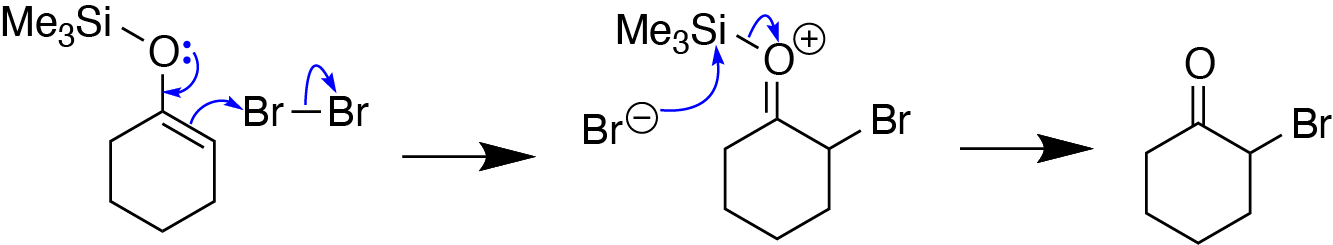
Example halogenation of a silyl enol ether.

Acyloins form upon organic oxidation with an electrophilic source of oxygen such as an oxaziridine or mCPBA.

In the Saegusa–Ito oxidation, certain silyl enol ethers are oxidized to enones with palladium(II) acetate.

=== Sulfenylation ===
Reacting a silyl enol ether with PhSCl, a good and soft electrophile, provides a carbonyl compound sulfenylated at an alpha carbon. In this reaction, the trimethylsilyl group of the silyl enol ether is removed by the chloride ion released from the PhSCl upon attack of its electrophilic sulfur atom.

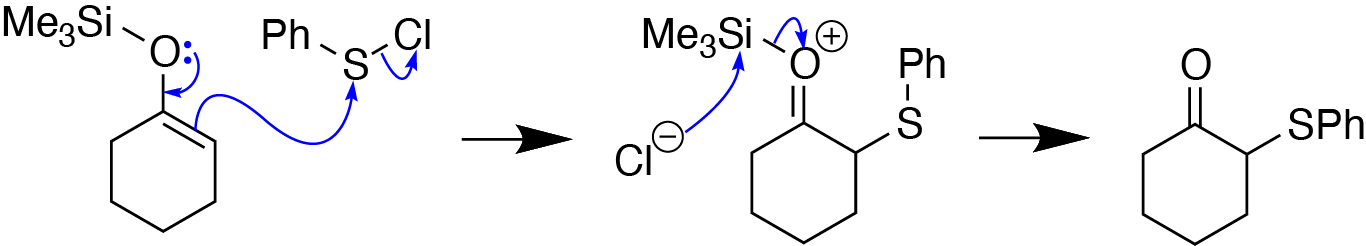
Example sulfenylation of a silyl enol ether.

=== Hydrolysis ===
Hydrolysis of a silyl enol ether results in the formation of a carbonyl compound and a disiloxane. In this reaction, water acts as an oxygen nucleophile and attacks the silicon of the silyl enol ether. This leads to the formation of the carbonyl compound and a trimethylsilanol intermediate that undergoes nucleophilic substitution at silicon (by another trimethylsilanol) to give the disiloxane.

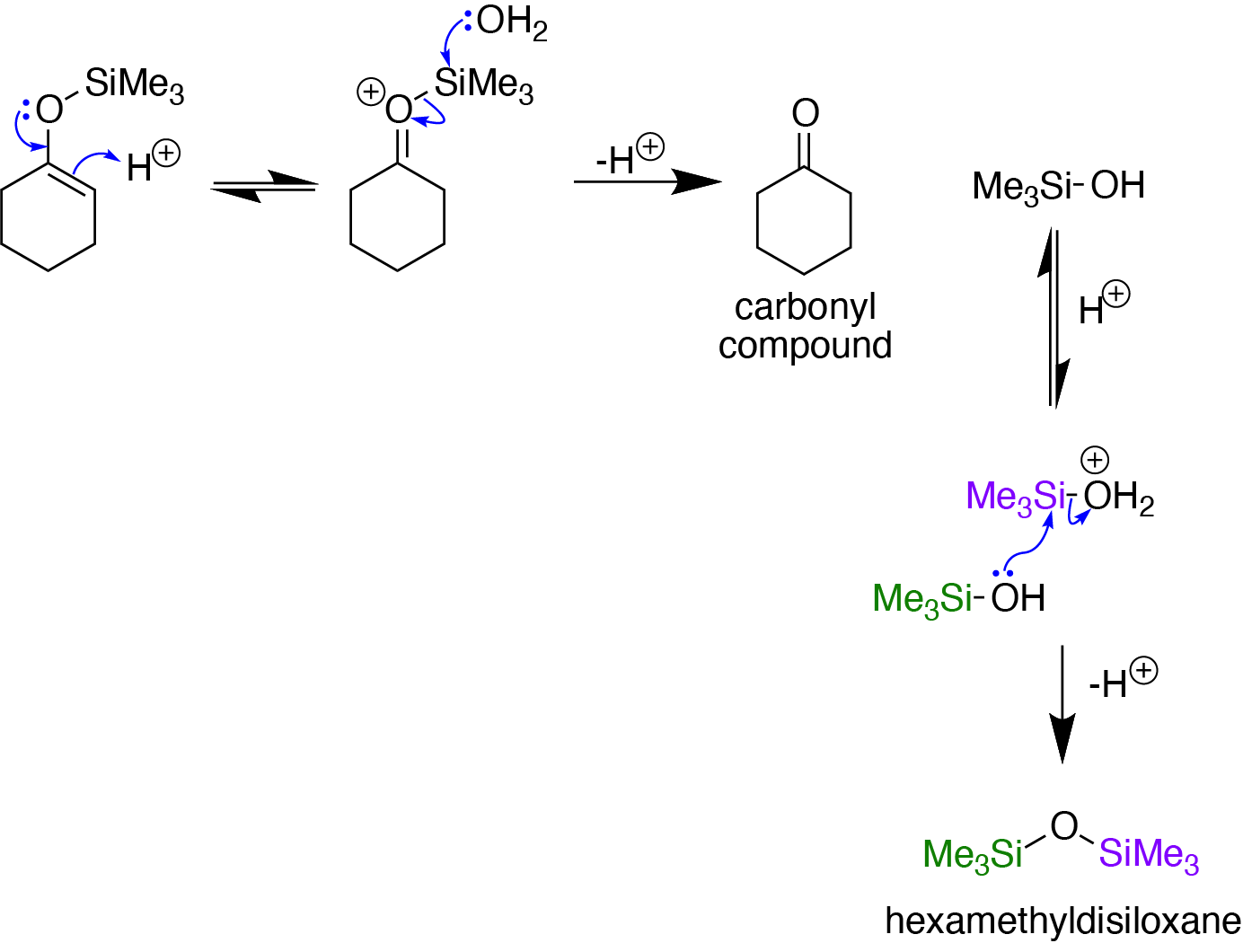
Example hydrolysis of a silyl enol ether to give a carbonyl compound and hexamethyldisiloxane.

=== Ring contraction ===
Cyclic silyl enol ethers undergo regiocontrolled one-carbon ring contractions. These reactions employ electron-deficient sulfonyl azides, which undergo chemoselective, uncatalyzed [3+2] cycloaddition to the silyl enol ether, followed by loss of dinitrogen, and alkyl migration to give ring-contracted products in good yield. These reactions may be directed by substrate stereochemistry, giving rise to stereoselective ring-contracted product formation.

== Silyl ketene acetals ==
Silyl enol ethers of esters (−OR) or carboxylic acids (−COOH) are called silyl ketene acetals and have the general structure R_{3}Si−O−C(OR)=CR_{2}. These compounds are more nucleophilic than the silyl enol ethers of ketones (>C=O).

General structure of a silyl ketene acetal.
