= Carvone =

- Carvone

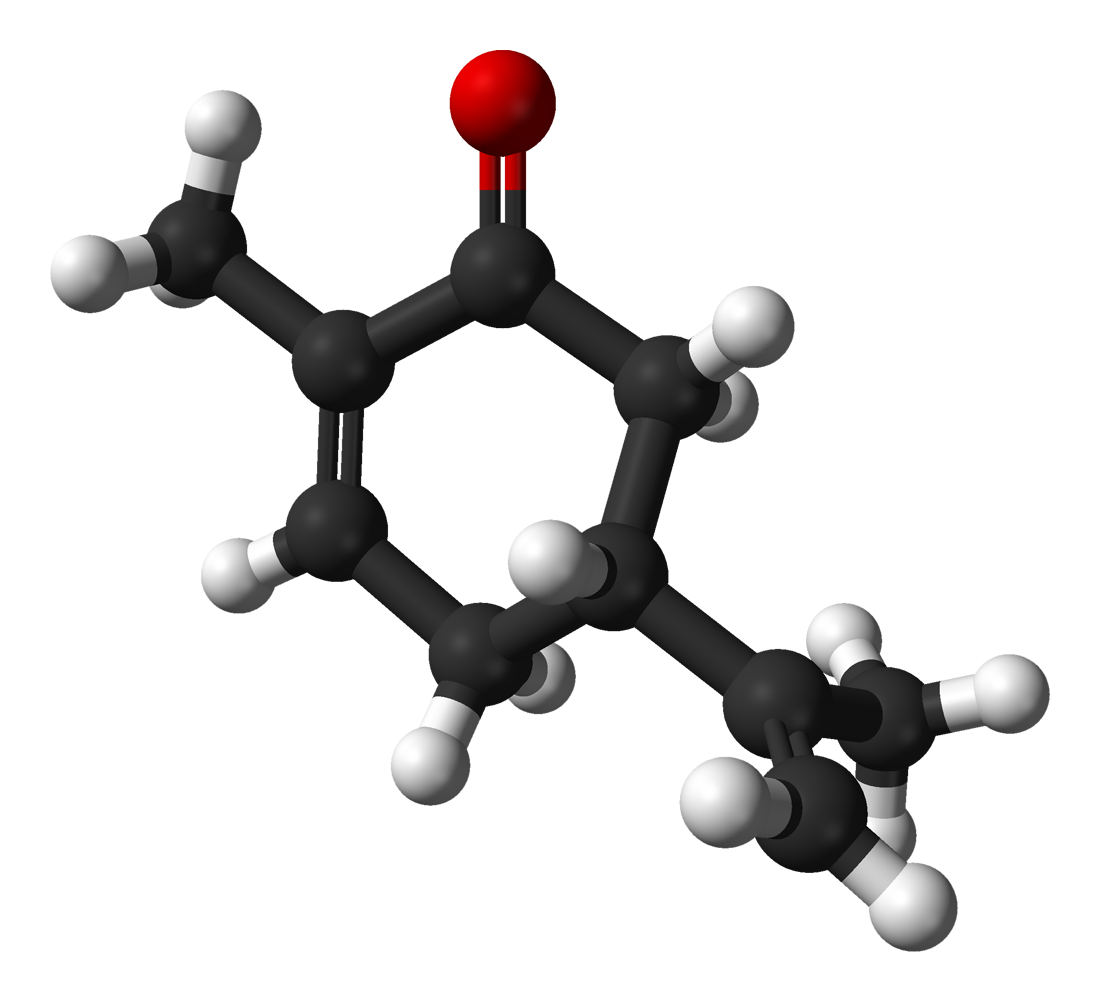

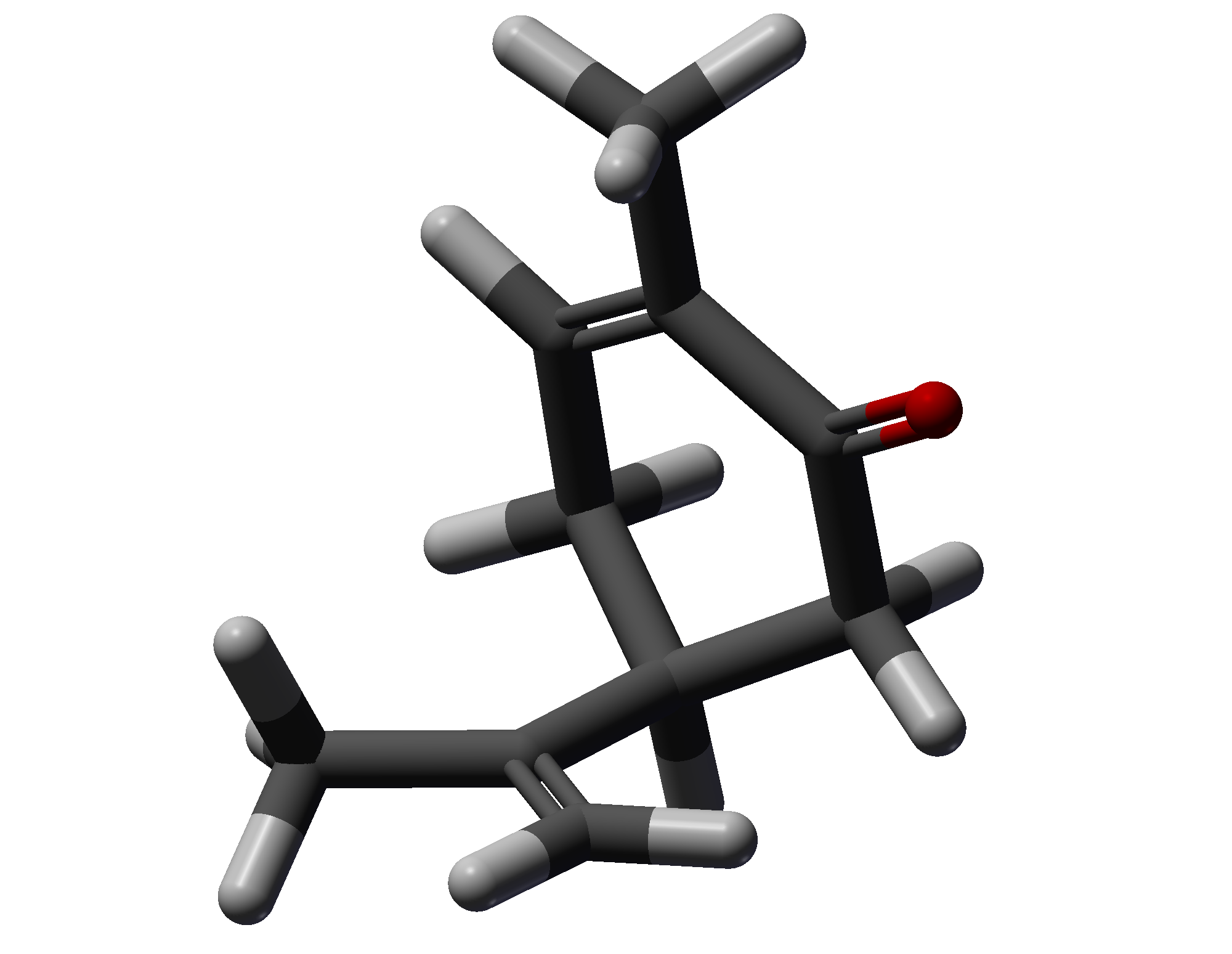

Names
- Preferred IUPAC name 2-Methyl-5-(prop-1-en-2-yl)cyclohex-2-en-1-one
- Other names 2-Methyl-5-(prop-1-en-2-yl)cyclohex-2-enone; 2-Methyl-5-(1-methylethenyl)-2-cyclohexenone; Δ^{6:8(9)}-p-Menthadien-2-one; 1-Methyl-4-isopropenyl-Δ^{6}-cyclohexen-2-one; Carvol (obsolete)

Identifiers
CAS Number	99-49-0 (R/S); 6485-40-1 (R); 2244-16-8 (S)
3D model (JSmol)	(R): Interactive image; (S): Interactive image
ChEBI	CHEBI:38265
ChEMBL	ChEMBL15676
ChemSpider	21106424 (R/S); 15855 (S); 388655 (R)
ECHA InfoCard	100.002.508
KEGG	C01767
PubChem CID	7439
RTECS number	OS8650000 (R) OS8670000 (S)
UNII	75GK9XIA8I (R/S); 5TO7X34D3D (R); 4RWC1CMS3X (S)
CompTox Dashboard (EPA)	DTXSID8047426
- InChI: InChI=1S/C10H14O/c1-7(2)9-5-4-8(3)10(11)6-9/h4,9H,1,5-6H2,2-3H3 Key: ULDHMXUKGWMISQ-UHFFFAOYSA-N; InChI=1/C10H14O/c1-7(2)9-5-4-8(3)10(11)6-9/h4,9H,1,5-6H2,2-3H3 Key: ULDHMXUKGWMISQ-UHFFFAOYAB
- SMILES: (R): O=C1C[C@@H](C\C=C1\C)C(C)=C; (S): O=C1C[C@H](C\C=C1\C)C(C)=C

Properties
Chemical formula	C_{10}H_{14}O
Molar mass	150.22 g/mol
Appearance	Clear, colorless liquid
Density	0.96 g/cm^{3}
Melting point	25.2 °C (77.4 °F; 298.3 K)
Boiling point	231 °C (448 °F; 504 K) (91 °C @ 5 mmHg)
Solubility in water	Insoluble (cold); Slightly soluble (hot)/soluble in trace amounts
Solubility in ethanol	Soluble
Solubility in diethyl ether	Soluble
Solubility in chloroform	Soluble
Chiral rotation ([α]_{D})	−61° (R)-Carvone; 61° (S)-Carvone
Magnetic susceptibility (χ)	−92.2×10^{−6} cm^{3}/mol

Hazards
- Occupational safety and health (OHS/OSH)
Main hazards	Flammable
- GHS labelling
Pictograms	(GHS07: Exclamation mark) (GHS08: Health hazard) (GHS09: Environmental hazard)
Signal word	Danger
Hazard statements	H304, H315, H317, H411
Precautionary statements	P261, P264, P270, P272, P273, P280, P301+P310, P301+P312, P302+P352, P321, P330, P331, P332+P313, P333+P313, P362, P363, P391, P405, P501
NFPA 704 (fire diamond)	1 2 0
Safety data sheet (SDS)	External MSDS

Related compounds
Related ketone	menthone dihydrocarvone carvomenthone
Related compounds	limonene, menthol, p-cymene, carveol
- Except where otherwise noted, data are given for materials in their standard state (at 25 °C [77 °F], 100 kPa). verify (what is ?) Infobox references

Carvone is a member of a family of chemicals called terpenoids. Carvone is found naturally in many essential oils, but is most abundant in the oils from seeds of caraway (Carum carvi), spearmint (Mentha spicata), and dill.

== Uses ==
=== Food applications ===
Both carvones are used in the food and flavor industry. As the compound most responsible for the flavor of caraway, dill, and spearmint, carvone has been used for millennia in food. Food applications are mainly met by carvone made from limonene. R-(−)-Carvone is also used for air freshening products and, like many essential oils, oils containing carvones are used in aromatherapy and alternative medicine.

=== Agriculture ===
S-(+)-Carvone is also used to prevent premature sprouting of potatoes during storage, being marketed in the Netherlands for this purpose under the name Talent.

=== Insect control ===
R-(−)-Carvone has been approved by the U.S. Environmental Protection Agency for use as a mosquito repellent.

== Stereoisomerism and odor ==
(R) gives spearmint its distinctive smell. (S) gives caraway its distinctive smell.

Carvone has two mirror image forms, or enantiomers: R-(−)-carvone, the sweetish minty smell of spearmint leaves. Its mirror image, S-(+)-carvone, has a spicy aroma with notes of rye, and gives caraway seeds their smell.

The fact that the two enantiomers are perceived as smelling different is evidence that olfactory receptors must respond more strongly to one enantiomer than to the other. Not all enantiomers have distinguishable odors. Squirrel monkeys have also been found to be able to discriminate between carvone enantiomers.

The two forms are also referred to, in older texts, by their optical rotations of laevo (l) referring to R-(−)-carvone, and dextro (d) referring to S-(+)-carvone. Modern naming refers to levorotatory isomers with the sign (−) and dextrorotatory isomers with the sign (+) in the systematic name.

== Occurrence ==
S-(+)-Carvone is the principal constituent (60–70%) of the oil from caraway seeds (Carum carvi), which is produced on a scale of about 10 tonnes per year. It also occurs to the extent of about 40–60% in dill seed oil (from Anethum graveolens), and also in mandarin orange peel oil. R-(−)-Carvone is also the most abundant compound in the essential oil from several species of mint, particularly spearmint oil (Mentha spicata), which is composed of 50–80% R-(−)-carvone. Spearmint is a major source of naturally produced R-(−)-carvone. However, the majority of R-(−)-carvone used in commercial applications is synthesized from R-(+)-limonene. The R-(−)-carvone isomer also occurs in kuromoji oil. Some oils, like gingergrass oil, contain a mixture of both enantiomers. Many other natural oils, for example peppermint oil, contain trace quantities of carvones.

== History ==
Caraway was used for medicinal purposes by the ancient Romans, but carvone was probably not isolated as a pure compound until Franz Varrentrapp (1815–1877) obtained it in 1849. It was originally called carvol by Schweizer. Goldschmidt and Zürrer identified it as a ketone related to limonene, and the structure was finally elucidated by Georg Wagner (1849–1903) in 1894.

== Preparation ==
Carvone can be obtained from natural sources but insufficient is available to meet demand. Instead most carvone is produced from limonene.

The dextro-form, S-(+)-carvone is obtained practically pure by the fractional distillation of caraway oil. The levo-form obtained from the oils containing it usually requires additional treatment to produce high purity R-(−)-carvone. This can be achieved by the formation of an addition compound with hydrogen sulfide, from which carvone may be regenerated by treatment with potassium hydroxide followed by steam distillation.

Carvone may be synthetically prepared from limonene by first treating limonene with nitrosyl chloride. Heating this nitroso compound gives carvoxime. Treating carvoxime with oxalic acid yields carvone. This procedure affords R-(−)-carvone from R-(+)-limonene.

The major use of d-limonene is as a precursor to S-(+)-carvone. The large scale availability of orange rinds, a byproduct in the production of orange juice, has made limonene cheaply available, and synthetic carvone correspondingly inexpensively prepared.

The biosynthesis of carvone is by oxidation of limonene.

== Chemical properties ==
=== Reduction ===
There are three double bonds in carvone capable of reduction; the product of reduction depends on the reagents and conditions used. Catalytic hydrogenation of carvone (1) can give either carvomenthol (2) or carvomenthone (3). Zinc and acetic acid reduce carvone to give dihydrocarvone (4). MPV reduction using propan-2-ol and aluminium isopropoxide effects reduction of the carbonyl group only to provide carveol (5); a combination of sodium borohydride and CeCl_{3} (Luche reduction) is also effective. Hydrazine and potassium hydroxide give limonene (6) via a Wolff–Kishner reduction.

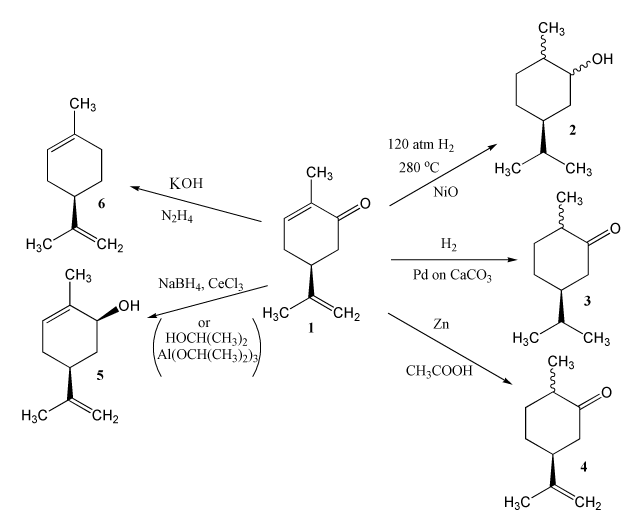
Various chemical reductions of carvone

=== Oxidation ===
Oxidation of carvone can also lead to a variety of products. In the presence of an alkali such as Ba(OH)_{2}, carvone is oxidised by air or oxygen to give the diketone 7. With hydrogen peroxide the epoxide 8 is formed. Carvone may be cleaved using ozone followed by steam, giving dilactone 9, while KMnO_{4} gives 10.

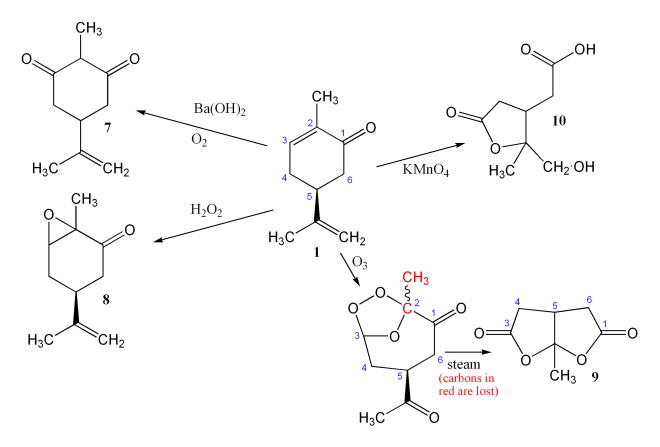
Various oxidations of carvone

=== Conjugate additions ===
As an α,β-unsaturated ketone, carvone undergoes conjugate additions of nucleophiles. For example, carvone reacts with lithium dimethylcuprate to place a methyl group trans to the isopropenyl group with good stereoselectivity. The resulting enolate can then be allylated using allyl bromide to give ketone 11.

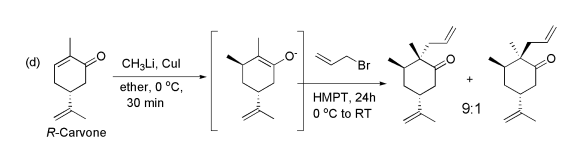
Methylation of carvone by Me_{2}CuLi, followed by allylation by allyl bromide

=== Other ===
Being available inexpensively in enantiomerically pure forms, carvone is an attractive starting material for the asymmetric total synthesis of natural products. For example, (S)-(+)-carvone was used to begin a 1998 synthesis of the terpenoid quassin:

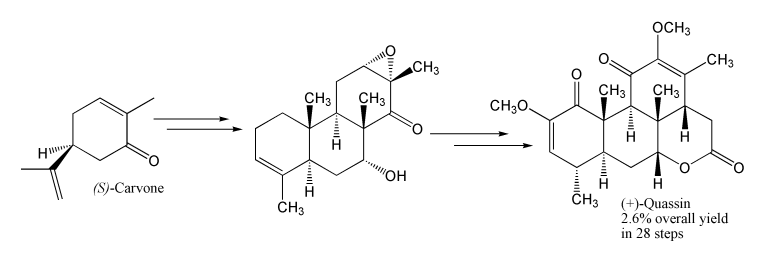
Asymmetric total synthesis of quassin from carvone

In 1908, it was reported that exposure of carvone to "Italian sunlight" for one year gives carvone-camphor. See enone–alkene cycloadditions.

== Metabolism ==
In the body, in vivo studies indicate that both enantiomers of carvone are mainly metabolized into dihydrocarvonic acid, carvonic acid and uroterpenolone. (–)-Carveol is also formed as a minor product via reduction by NADPH. (+)-Carvone is likewise converted to (+)-carveol. This mainly occurs in the liver and involves cytochrome P450 oxidase and (+)-trans-carveol dehydrogenase.
