= Carveol =

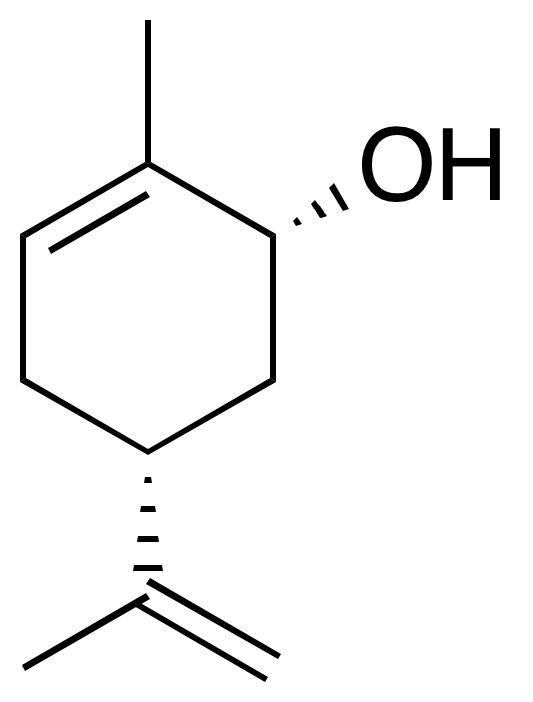
(1R,5R)-Carveol
((–)-cis)
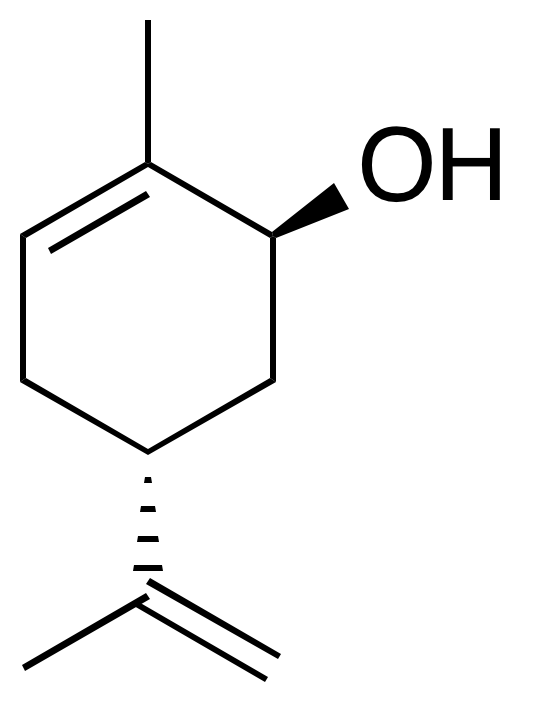
(1S,5R)-Carveol
((–)-trans)
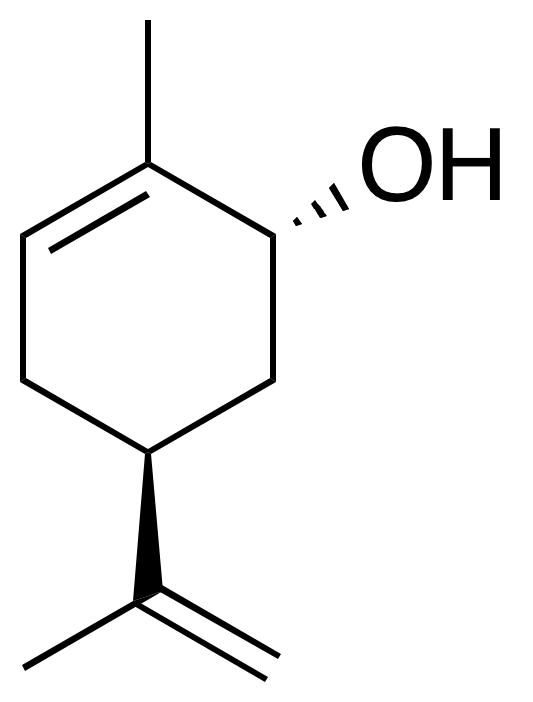
(1R,5S)-Carveol
((+)-trans)
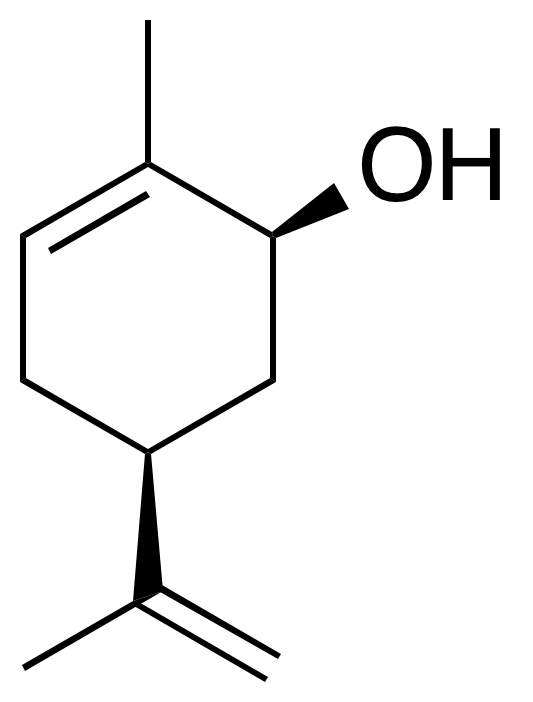
(1S,5S)-Carveol
((+)-cis)

Names
- Preferred IUPAC name 2-Methyl-5-(prop-1-en-2-yl)cyclohex-2-en-1-ol
- Other names 2-Methyl-5-(1-methylethenyl)-2-cyclohexen-1-ol; Mentha-6,8-dien-2-ol

Identifiers
| CAS Number | 99-48-9 |
| 3D model (JSmol) | Interactive image; Interactive image |
| Beilstein Reference | 1861032 |
| ChEBI | CHEBI:23046; CHEBI:227; CHEBI:232 |
| ChEMBL | ChEMBL1385229; ChEMBL1907992; ChEMBL1908058 |
| ChemSpider | 7160; 2006207 (5R); 9259214 (5S); 292842 (1R,5R); 391450 (1R,5S) |
| ECHA InfoCard | 100.002.507 |
| EC Number | 202-757-4 |
| IUPHAR/BPS | 6417 |
| KEGG | C11395 |
| MeSH | Carveol |
| PubChem CID | 7438; 2724032 (5R); 11084068 (5S); 330573 (1R,5R); 443178 (1R,5S) |
| RTECS number | OS8400000 |
| UNII | 1L9KXT85R9 |
| CompTox Dashboard (EPA) | DTXSID3024736 |
- InChI: InChI=1S/C10H16O/c1-7(2)9-5-4-8(3)10(11)6-9/h4,9-11H,1,5-6H2,2-3H3 Key: BAVONGHXFVOKBV-UHFFFAOYSA-N; InChI=1/C10H16O/c1-7(2)9-5-4-8(3)10(11)6-9/h4,9-11H,1,5-6H2,2-3H3
- SMILES: CC(=C)C1CC=C(C)C(O)C1; OC1C(=C/CC(/C(=C)C)C1)\C

Properties
| Chemical formula | C_{10}H_{16}O |
| Molar mass | 152.237 g·mol^{−1} |
| Density | 0.958 g cm^{−3} |
| Boiling point | 226 to 227 °C (439 to 441 °F; 499 to 500 K) |

Hazards
- GHS labelling
| Pictograms | (GHS07: Exclamation mark) |
| Signal word | Warning |
| Hazard statements | H315, H319, H335 |
| Precautionary statements | P261, P264, P271, P280, P302+P352, P304+P340, P305+P351+P338, P312, P321, P332+P313, P337+P313, P362, P403+P233, P405, P501 |
| NFPA 704 (fire diamond) | 1 1 0 |
| Flash point | 98 °C (208 °F; 371 K) |
- Except where otherwise noted, data are given for materials in their standard state (at 25 °C [77 °F], 100 kPa). verify (what is ?) Infobox references

Carveol is a natural unsaturated, monocyclic monoterpenoid alcohol that is a constituent of spearmint essential oil in the form of cis-(−)-carveol. It is a colorless fluid soluble in oils, but insoluble in water and has an odor and flavor that resemble those of spearmint and caraway. Consequently, it is used as a fragrance in cosmetics and as a flavor additive in the food industry.

It has been found to exhibit chemoprevention of mammary carcinogenesis (prevents breast cancer).

An alpha-trans-dihydroxy derivative, (1R,2R,6S)-3-methyl-6-(prop-1-en-2-yl)cyclohex-3-ene-1,2-diol, possesses potent antiparkinsonian activity in animal models.

== Biosynthesis ==
Monoterpenes such as carveol are produced from geranyl pyrophosphate. The immediate precursor in plants including peppermint and spearmint is limonene. Oxidation of the (S) enantiomer by (S)-limonene 6-monooxygenase gives (−)-trans-carveol:

(S)-limonene
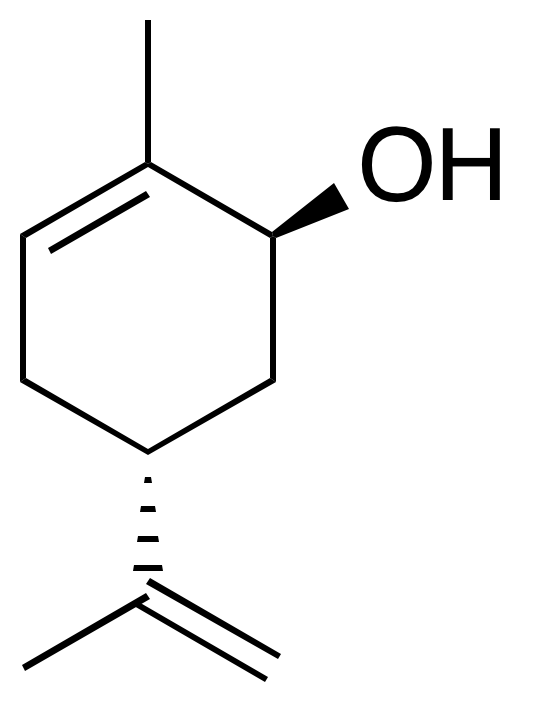
(−)-trans-carveol

An alternative enzyme, (R)-limonene 6-monooxygenase is present in caraway and gives (+)-trans-carveol.

(R)-limonene
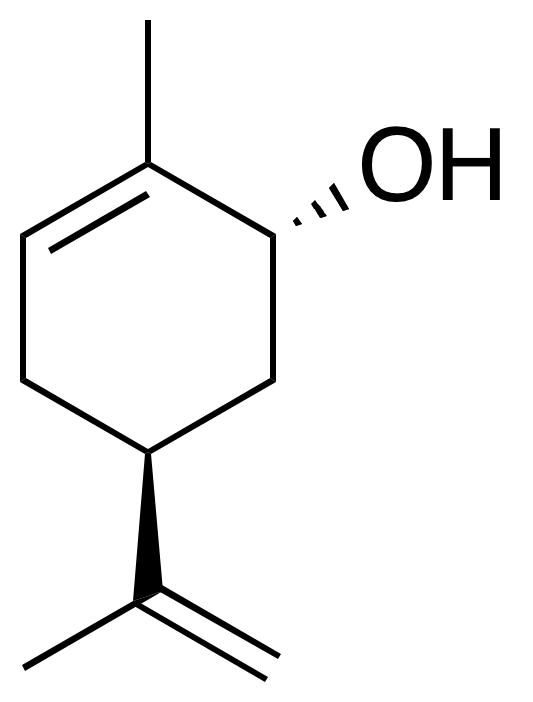
(+)-trans-carveol
