= Ei mechanism =

Reaction mechanism in organic chemistry

In organic chemistry, the E_{i} mechanism (Elimination Internal/Intramolecular), also known as a thermal syn elimination or a pericyclic syn elimination, is a special type of elimination reaction in which two vicinal (adjacent) substituents on an alkane framework leave simultaneously via a cyclic transition state to form an alkene in a syn elimination. This type of elimination is unique because it is thermally activated and does not require additional reagents, unlike regular eliminations, which require an acid or base, or would in many cases involve charged intermediates. This reaction mechanism is often found in pyrolysis.

== General features ==
Compounds that undergo elimination through cyclic transition states upon heating, with no other reagents present, are given the designation as E_{i} reactions. Depending on the compound, elimination takes place through a four, five, or six-membered transition state.

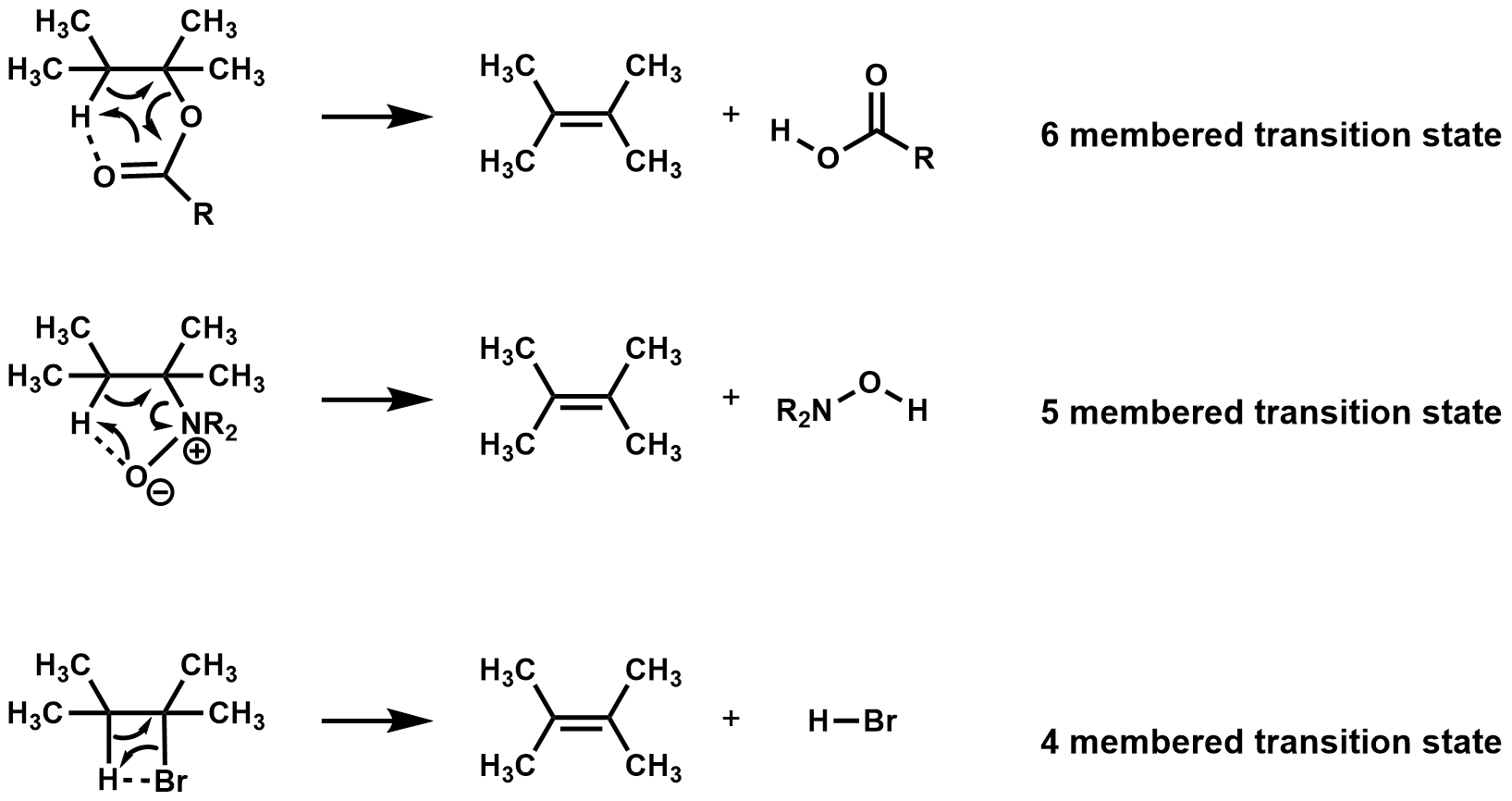

The elimination must be syn and the atoms coplanar for four and five-membered transition states, but coplanarity is not required for six-membered transition states.

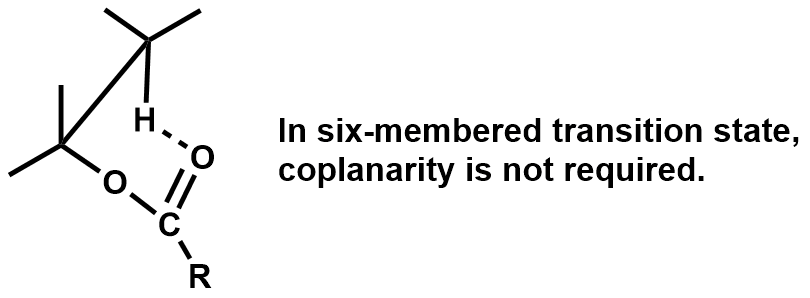

There is a substantial amount of evidence to support the existence of the E_{i} mechanism such as: 1) the kinetics of the reactions were found to be first order, 2) the use of free-radical inhibitors did not affect the rate of the reactions, indicating no free-radical mechanisms are involved 3) isotope studies for the Cope elimination indicate the C-H and C-N bonds are partially broken in the transition state, this is also supported by computations that show bond lengthening in the transition state and 4) without the intervention of other mechanisms, the E_{i} mechanism gives exclusively syn elimination products.

There are many factors that affect the product composition of E_{i} reactions, but typically they follow Hofmann’s rule and lose a β-hydrogen from the least substituted position, giving the alkene that is less substituted (the opposite of Zaitsev's rule). Some factors affecting product composition include steric effects, conjugation, and stability of the forming alkene.

For acyclic substrates, the Z-isomer is typically the minor product due to the destabilizing gauche interaction in the transition state, but the selectivity is not usually high.

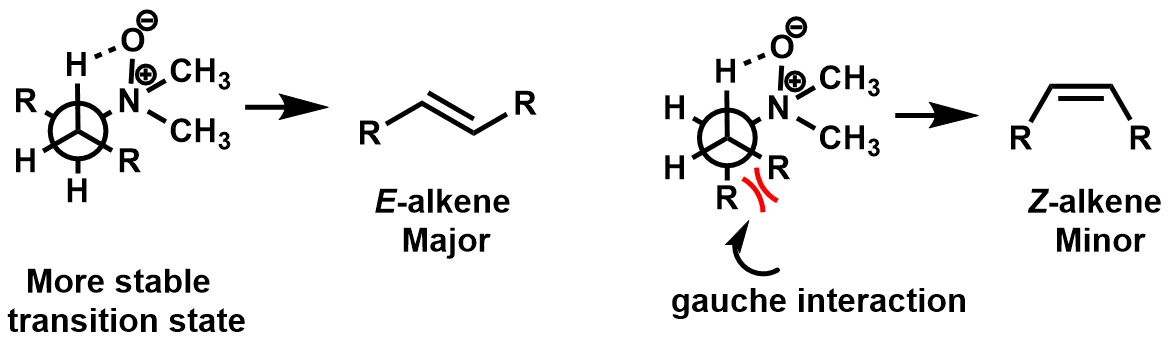

The pyrolysis of N,N-dimethyl-2-phenylcyclohexylamine-N-oxide shows how conformational effects and the stability of the transition state affect product composition for cyclic substrates.

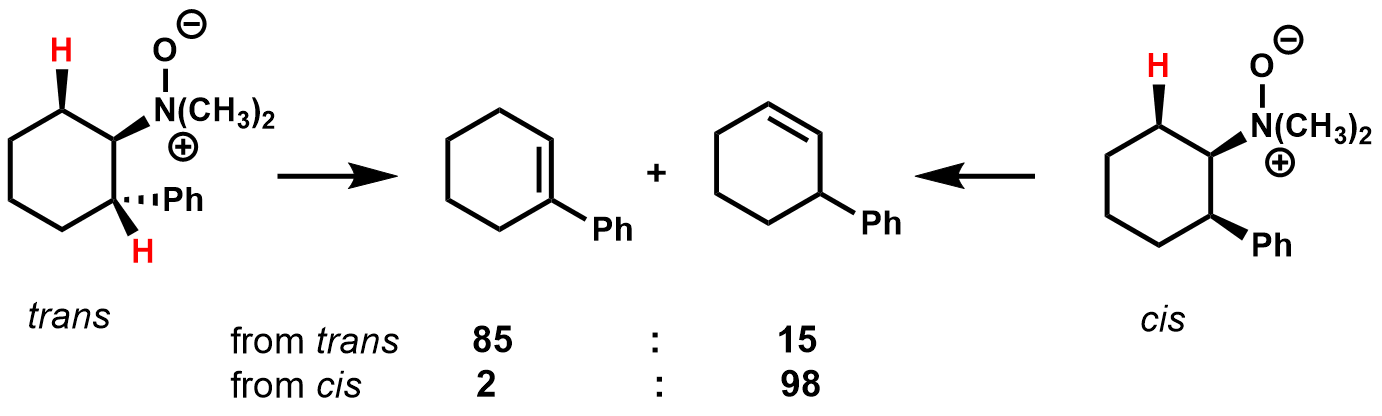

In the trans isomer, there are two cis-β-hydrogens that can eliminate. The major product is the alkene that is in conjugation with the phenyl ring, presumably due to the stabilizing effect on the transition state. In the cis isomer, there is only one cis-B-hydrogen that can eliminate, giving the nonconjugated regioisomer as the major product.

== Ester (acetate) pyrolysis ==
The pyrolytic decomposition of esters is an example of a thermal syn elimination. When subjected to temperatures above 400 °C, esters containing β-hydrogens can eliminate a carboxylic acid through a 6-membered transition state, resulting in an alkene.

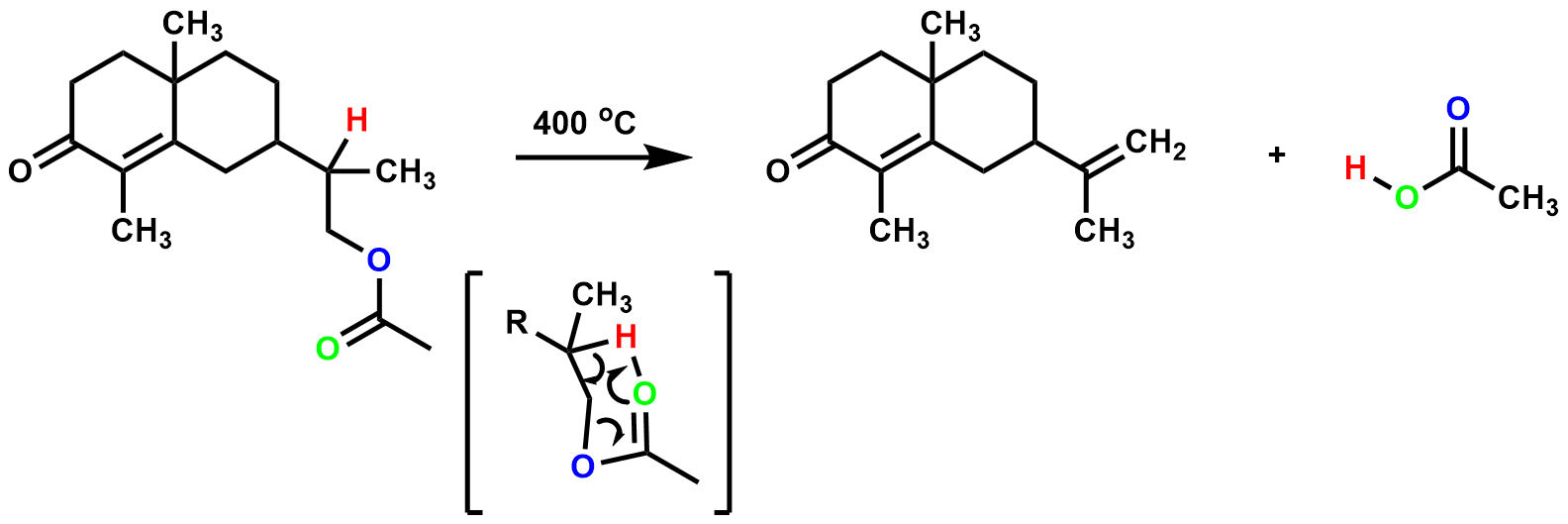

Isotopic labeling was used to confirm that syn elimination occurs during ester pyrolysis in the formation of stilbene.

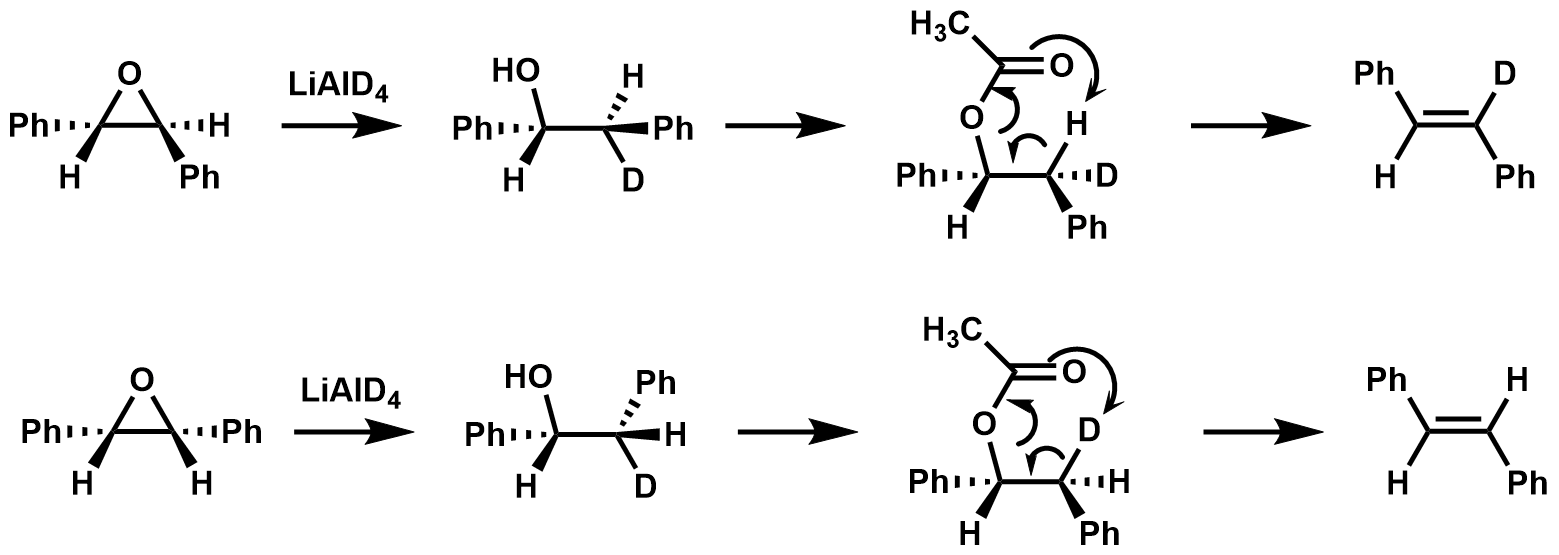

== Sulfur-based ==
=== Sulfoxide elimination ===
β-hydroxy phenyl sulfoxides were found to undergo thermal elimination through a 5-membered cyclic transition state, yielding β-keto esters and methyl ketones after tautomerization and a sulfenic acid.

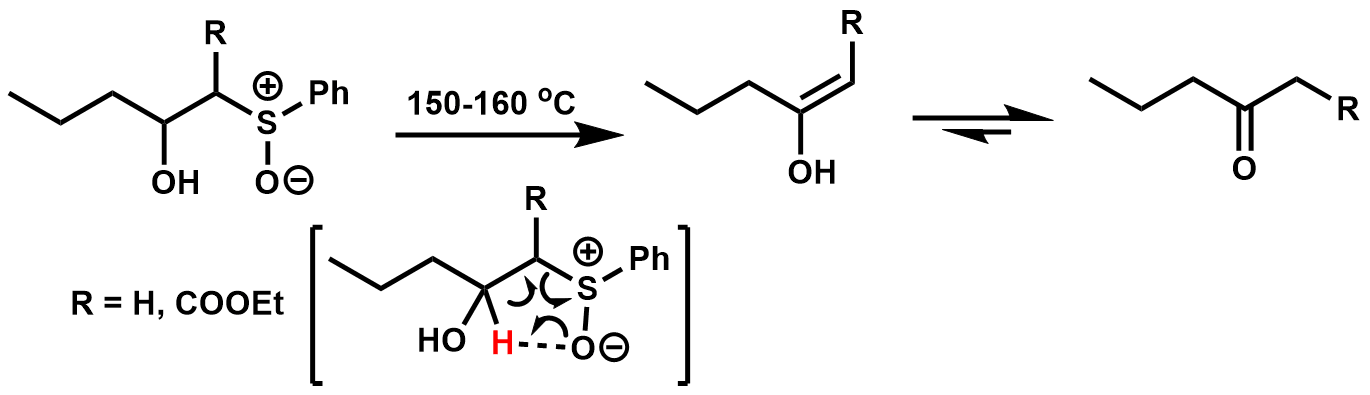

Allylic alcohols can be formed from β-hydroxy phenyl sulfoxides that contain a β’-hydrogen through an E_{i} mechanism, tending to give the β,γ-unsaturation.

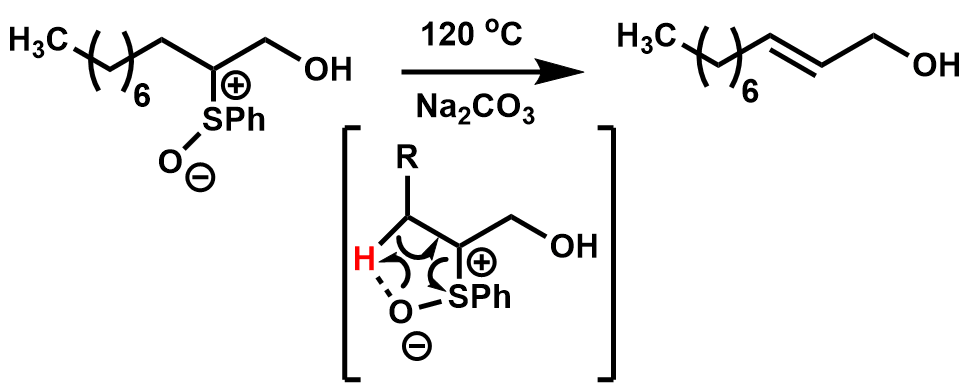

1,3-Dienes were found to be formed upon the treatment of an allylic alcohol with an aryl sulfide in the presence of triethylamine. Initially, a sulfenate ester is formed followed by a [2,3]-sigmatropic rearrangement to afford an allylic sulfoxide which undergoes thermal syn elimination to yield the 1,3-diene.

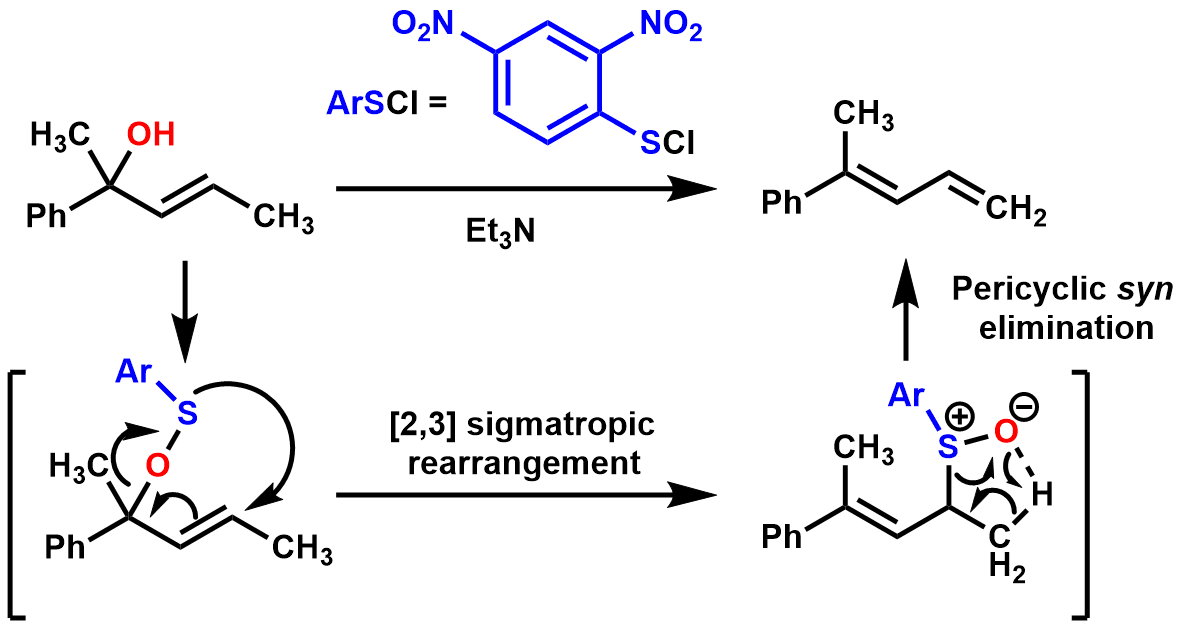

=== Chugaev elimination ===
The Chugaev elimination is the pyrolysis of a xanthate ester, resulting in an olefin. To form the xanthate ester, an alcohol reacts with carbon disulfide in the presence of a base, resulting in a metal xanthate which is trapped with an alkylating agent (typically methyl iodide). The olefin is formed through the thermal syn elimination of the β-hydrogen and xanthate ester. The reaction is irreversible because the resulting by-products, carbonyl sulfide and methanethiol, are very stable.

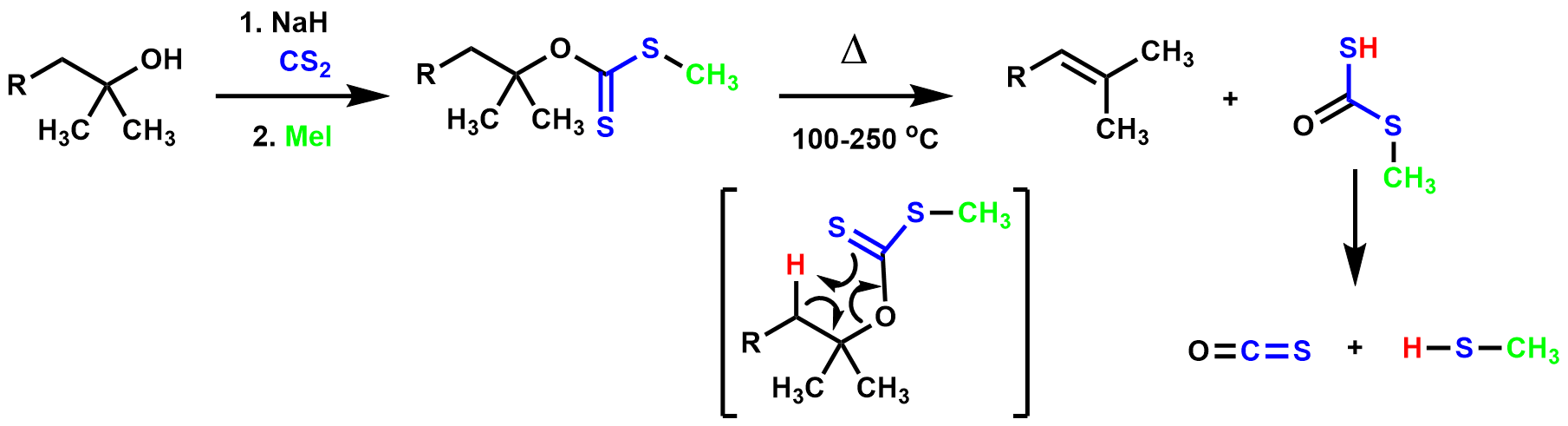

The Chugaev elimination is very similar to the ester pyrolysis, but requires significantly lower temperatures to achieve the elimination, thus making it valuable for rearrangement-prone substrates.

=== Burgess dehydration reaction ===
The dehydration of secondary and tertiary alcohols to yield an olefin through a sulfamate ester intermediate is called the Burgess dehydration reaction. The reaction conditions used are typically very mild, giving it some advantage over other dehydration methods for sensitive substrates. This reaction was used during the first total synthesis of taxol to install an exo-methylene group on the C ring.

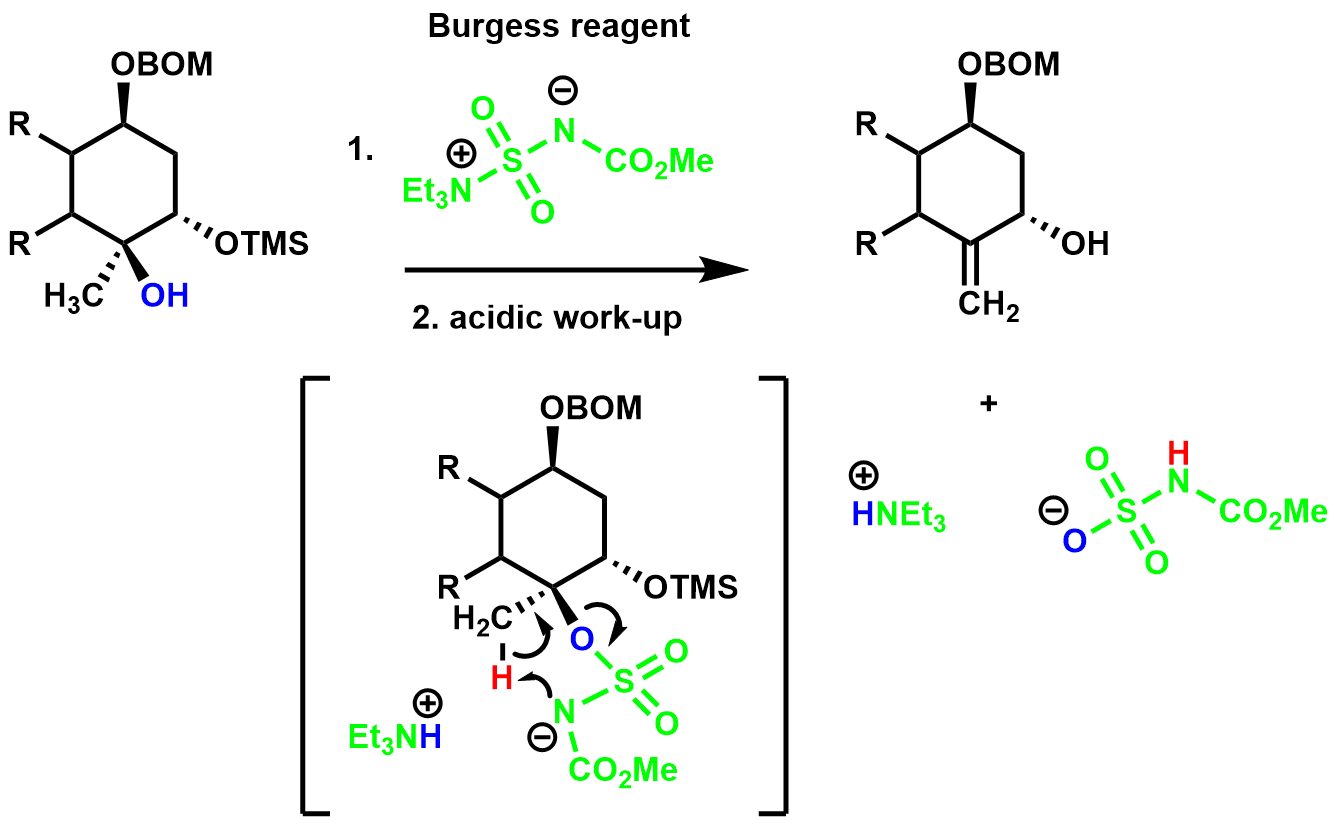

First, the alcohol displaces the triethylamine on the Burgess reagent, forming the sulfamate ester intermediate. β-hydrogen abstraction and elimination of the sulfamate ester through a 6-membered cyclic transition state yields the alkene.

=== Thiosulfinate elimination ===
Thiosulfinates can eliminate in the manner analogous to sulfoxides. Representative is the fragmentation of allicin to thioacrolein, which will go on to form vinyldithiins. Such reactions are important in the antioxidant chemistry of garlic and other plants of the genus Allium.

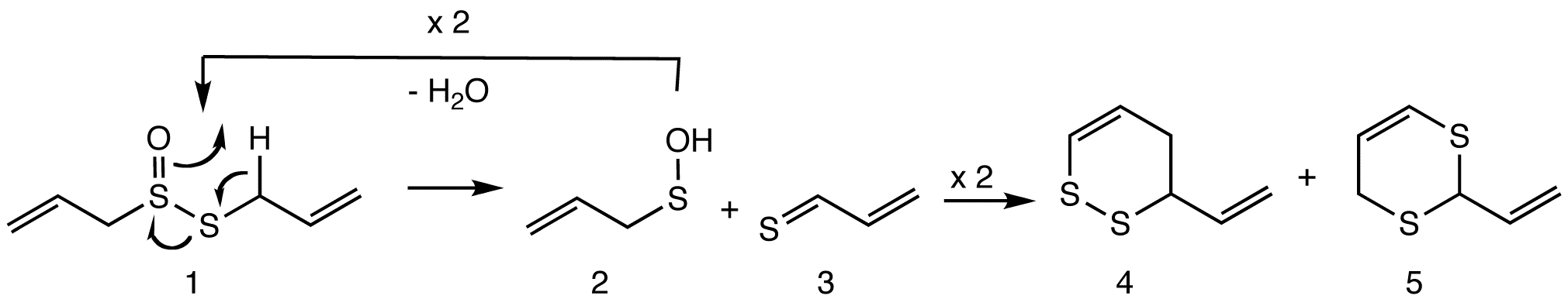

== Selenium-based ==
=== Selenoxide elimination ===
The selenoxide elimination has been used in converting ketones, esters, and aldehydes to their α,β-unsaturated derivatives.

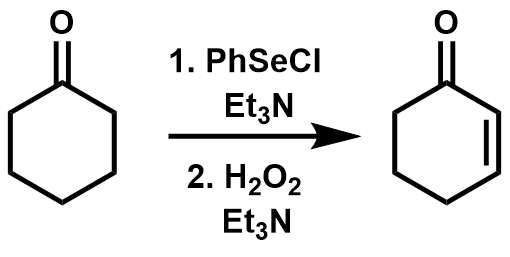

The mechanism for this reaction is analogous to the sulfoxide elimination, which is a thermal syn elimination through a 5-membered cyclic transition state. Selenoxides are preferred for this type of transformation over sulfoxides due to their increased reactivity toward β-elimination, in some cases allowing the elimination to take place at room temperature.

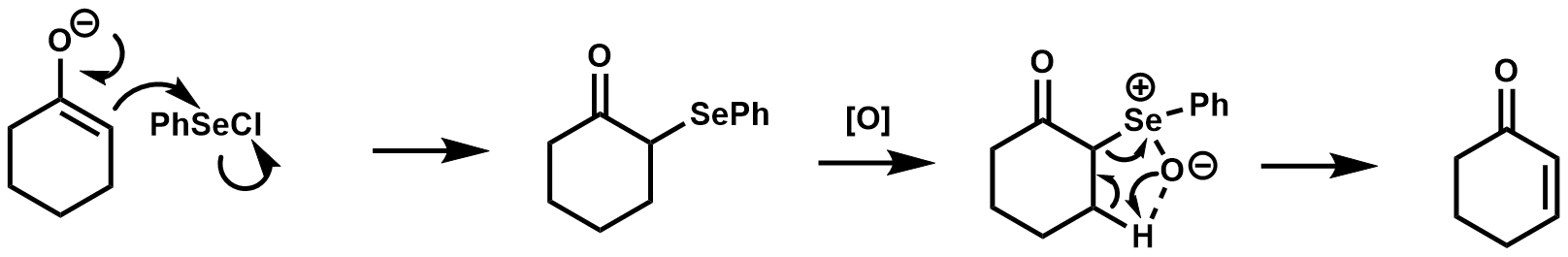

The areneselenic acid generated after the elimination step is in equilibrium with the diphenyl diselenide which can react with olefins to yield β-hydroxy selenides under acidic or neutral conditions. Under basic conditions, this side reaction is suppressed.

=== Grieco elimination ===
The one-pot dehydration of a primary alcohol to give an alkene through an o-nitrophenyl selenoxide intermediate is called the Grieco elimination.

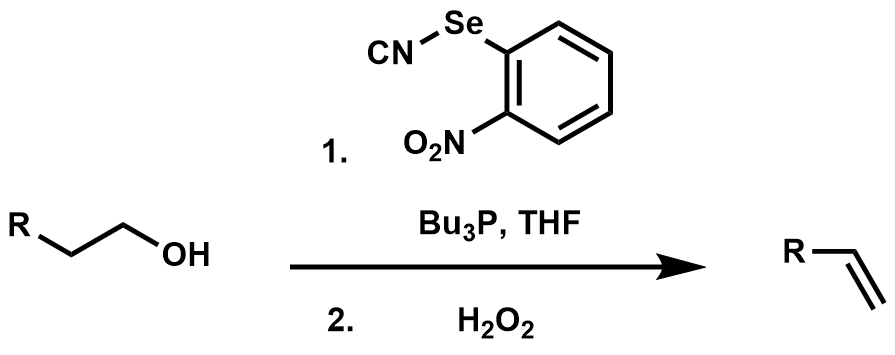

The reaction begins with the formation of a selenophosphonium salt which reacts with the alcohol to form an oxaphosphonium salt. The aryl selenium anion displaces tributylphosphine oxide forming the alkyl aryl selenide species. The selenide is then treated with excess hydrogen peroxide leading to the selenoxide which eliminates the β-hydrogen through a 5-member cyclic transition state, yielding an alkene.

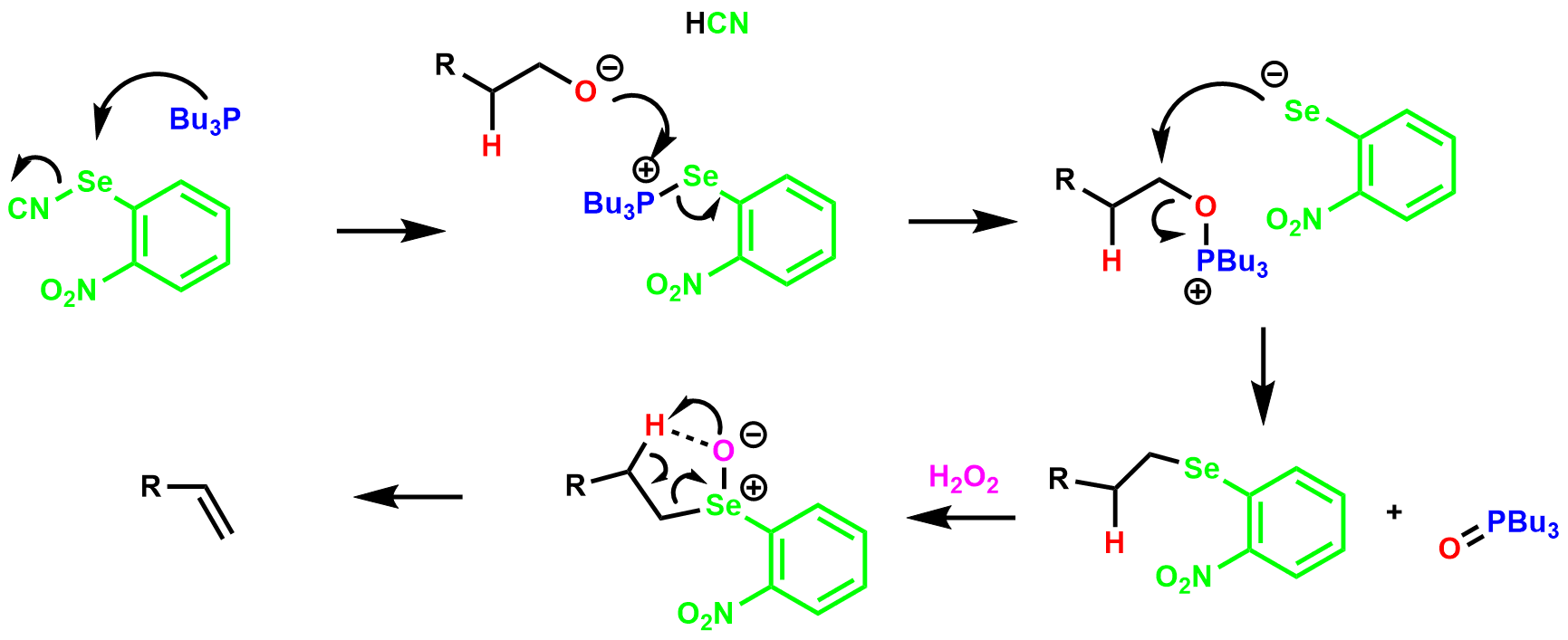

The electron-withdrawing nitro group was found to increase both the rate of elimination and the final yield of the olefin.

== Nitrogen-based ==
=== Cope elimination ===
The Cope elimination (Cope reaction) is the elimination of a tertiary amine oxide to yield an alkene and a hydroxylamine through an E_{i} mechanism. The Cope elimination was used in the synthesis of a mannopyranosylamine mimic. The tertiary amine was oxidized to the amine oxide using m-chloroperoxybenzoic acid (mCPBA) and subjected to high temperatures for thermal syn elimination of the β-hydrogen and amine oxide through a cyclic transition state, yielding the alkene. It is worth noting that the indicated hydrogen (in green) is the only hydrogen available for syn elimination.

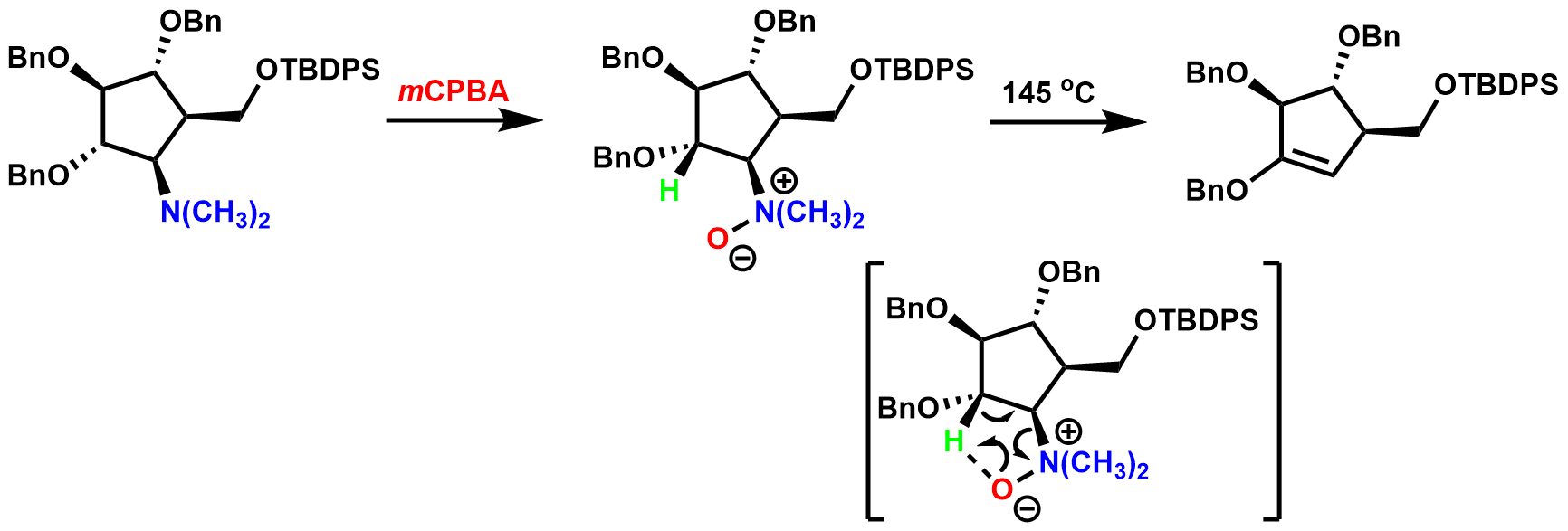

Cyclic amine oxides (5, 7-10-membered nitrogen containing rings) can also undergo internal syn elimination to yield acyclic hydroxylamines containing terminal alkenes.

=== Special cases for the Hofmann elimination ===
The mechanism for the Hofmann elimination is generally E2, but can go through an E_{i} pathway under certain circumstances. For some sterically hindered molecules the base deprotonates a methyl group on the amine instead of the β-hydrogen directly, forming an ylide intermediate which eliminates trimethylamine through a 5-membered transition state, forming the alkene. Deuterium labeling studies confirmed this mechanism by observing the formation of deuterated trimethylamine (and no deuterated water, which would form from the E2 mechanism).

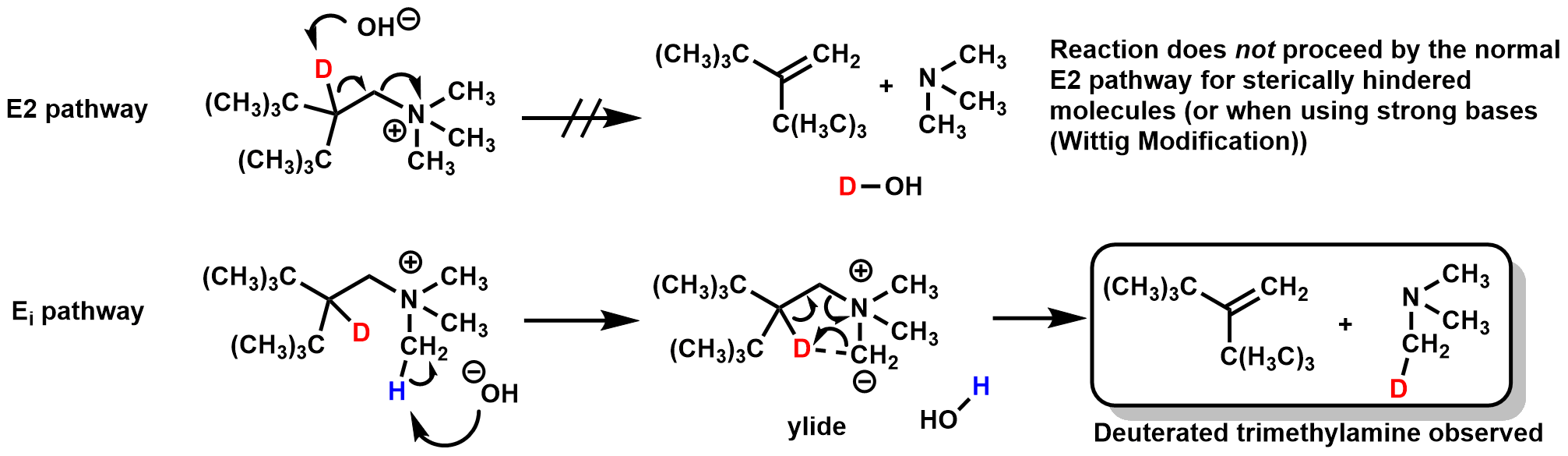

The Wittig modified Hofmann elimination goes through the same E_{i} mechanism, but instead of using silver oxide and water as base, the Wittig modification uses strong bases like alkylithiums or KNH2/liquid NH3.

== Iodoso elimination ==
Secondary and tertiary alkyl iodides with strongly electron-withdrawing groups at the α-carbon were found to undergo a pericyclic syn elimination when exposed to m-chloroperbenzoic acid (mCPBA). It is proposed that the reaction goes through an iodoso intermediate before the syn elimination of hypoiodous acid.

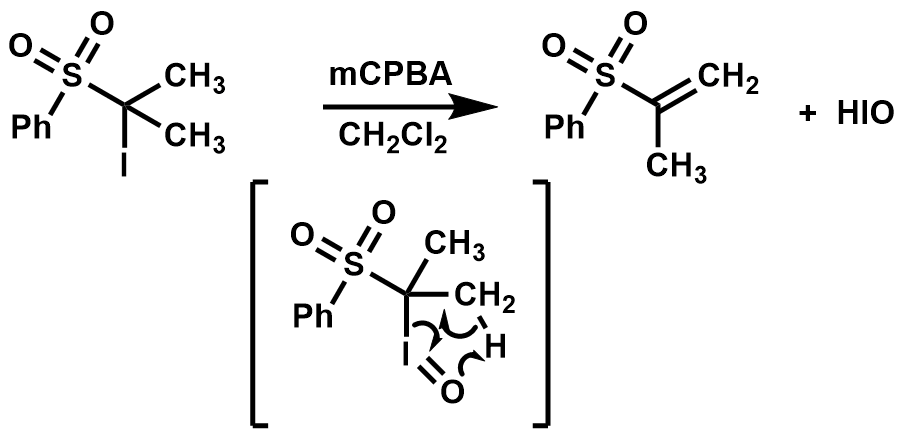

The scope of this reaction does not include primary alkyl iodides because the iodoso intermediate rearranges to the hypoiodite intermediate, which, under the reaction conditions, is converted to an alcohol. Strongly electron-withdrawing groups suppress the rearrangement pathway, allowing the pericyclic syn elimination pathway to predominate.
