= Zaytsev's rule =

Empirical rule in organic chemistry

In organic chemistry, Zaytsev's rule (or Zaitsev's rule, Saytzeff's rule, Saytzev's rule) is an empirical rule for predicting the favored alkene product(s) in elimination reactions. While at the University of Kazan, Russian chemist Alexander Zaytsev studied a variety of different elimination reactions and observed a general trend in the resulting alkenes. Based on this trend, Zaytsev proposed that the alkene formed in greatest amount is that which corresponded to removal of the hydrogen from the alpha-carbon having the fewest hydrogen substituents. For example, when 2-iodobutane is treated with alcoholic potassium hydroxide (KOH), but-2-ene is the major product and but-1-ene is the minor product.

More generally, Zaytsev's rule predicts that in an elimination reaction the most substituted product will be the most stable, and therefore the most favored. The rule makes no generalizations about the stereochemistry of the newly formed alkene, but only the regiochemistry of the elimination reaction. While effective at predicting the favored product for many elimination reactions, Zaytsev's rule is subject to many exceptions. Many of them include exceptions under Hofmann product (analogous to Zaytsev product). These include compounds having quaternary nitrogen and leaving groups like NR_{3}^{+}, SO_{3}H, etc. In these eliminations the Hofmann product is preferred. In case the leaving group is halogens, except fluorine; others give the Zaytsev product.

== History ==
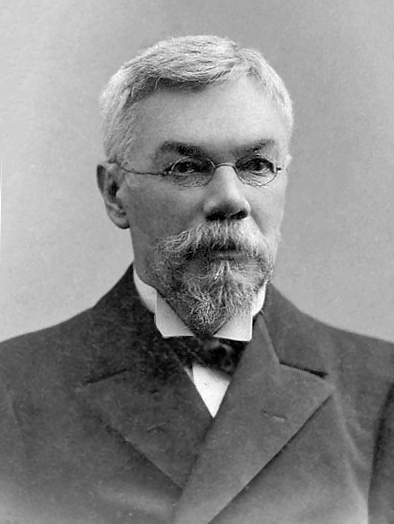
Alexander Mikhaylovich Zaytsev

Alexander Zaytsev first published his observations regarding the products of elimination reactions in Justus Liebigs Annalen der Chemie in 1875. Although the paper contained some original research done by Zaytsev's students, it was largely a literature review and drew heavily upon previously published work. In it, Zaytsev proposed a purely empirical rule for predicting the favored regiochemistry in the dehydrohalogenation of alkyl iodides, though it turns out that the rule is applicable to a variety of other elimination reactions as well. While Zaytsev's paper was well referenced throughout the 20th century, it was not until the 1960s that textbooks began using the term "Zaytsev's rule".

Zaytsev was not the first chemist to publish the rule that now bears his name. Aleksandr Nikolaevich Popov published an empirical rule similar to Zaytsev's in 1872, and presented his findings at the University of Kazan in 1873. Zaytsev had cited Popov's 1872 paper in previous work and worked at the University of Kazan, and was thus probably aware of Popov's proposed rule. In spite of this, Zaytsev's 1875 Liebigs Annalen paper makes no mention of Popov's work.

Any discussion of Zaytsev's rule would be incomplete without mentioning Vladimir Vasilyevich Markovnikov. Zaytsev and Markovnikov both studied under Alexander Butlerov, taught at the University of Kazan during the same period, and were bitter rivals. Markovnikov, who published in 1870 what is now known as Markovnikov's rule, and Zaytsev held conflicting views regarding elimination reactions: the former believed that the least substituted alkene would be favored, whereas the latter felt the most substituted alkene would be the major product. Perhaps one of the main reasons Zaytsev began investigating elimination reactions was to disprove his rival. Zaytsev published his rule for elimination reactions just after Markovnikov published the first article in a three-part series in Comptes Rendus detailing his rule for addition reactions.

== Thermodynamic considerations ==
The hydrogenation of alkenes to alkanes is exothermic. The amount of energy released during a hydrogenation reaction, known as the heat of hydrogenation, is inversely related to the stability of the starting alkene: the more stable the alkene, the lower its heat of hydrogenation. Examining the heats of hydrogenation for various alkenes reveals that stability increases with the amount of substitution.

Compound Name	Structure	Molar Heat of Hydrogenation		Degree of Substitution
Compound Name	Structure	in kJ/mol	in kcal/mol	Degree of Substitution
Ethylene	$\ce{H2C=CH2}$	137	32.8	Unsubstituted
1-Butene		127	30.3	Monosubstituted
trans-2-Butene		116	27.6	Disubstituted
2-Methyl-2-butene		113	26.9	Trisubstituted
2,3-Dimethyl-2-butene		111	26.6	Tetrasubstituted

The increase in stability associated with additional substitutions is the result of several factors. Alkyl groups are electron donating by inductive effect, and increase the electron density on the sigma bond of the alkene. Also, alkyl groups are sterically large, and are most stable when they are far away from each other. In an alkane, the maximum separation is that of the tetrahedral bond angle, 109.5°. In an alkene, the bond angle increases to near 120°. As a result, the separation between alkyl groups is greatest in the most substituted alkene.

Hyperconjugation, which describes the stabilizing interaction between the HOMO of the alkyl group and the LUMO of the double bond, also helps explain the influence of alkyl substitutions on the stability of alkenes. In regards to orbital hybridization, a bond between an sp^{2} carbon and an sp^{3} carbon is stronger than a bond between two sp^{3}-hybridized carbons. Computations reveal a dominant stabilizing hyperconjugation effect of 6 kcal/mol per alkyl group.

=== Steric effects ===
In E2 elimination reactions, a base abstracts a proton that is beta to a leaving group, such as a halide. The removal of the proton and the loss of the leaving group occur in a single, concerted step to form a new double bond. When a small, unhindered base – such as sodium hydroxide, sodium methoxide, or sodium ethoxide – is used for an E2 elimination, the Zaytsev product is typically favored over the least substituted alkene, known as the Hofmann product. For example, treating 2-Bromo-2-methyl butane with sodium ethoxide in ethanol produces the Zaytsev product with moderate selectivity.

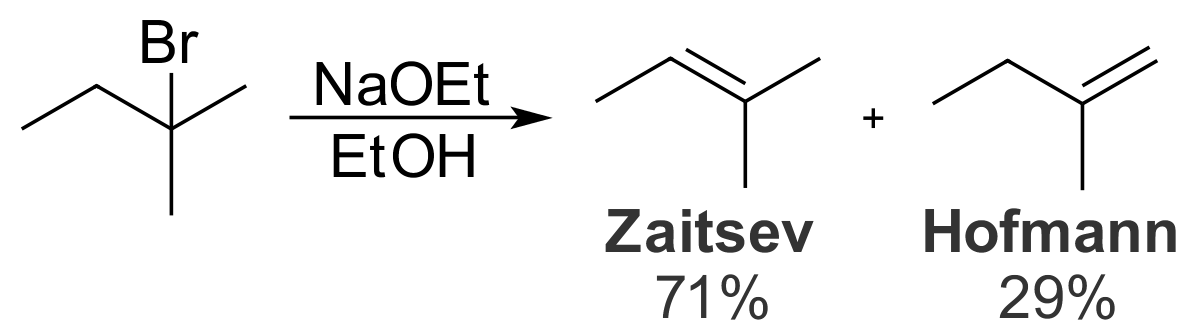

Due to steric interactions, a bulky base – such as potassium tert-butoxide, triethylamine, or 2,6-lutidine – cannot readily abstract the proton that would lead to the Zaytsev product. In these situations, a less sterically hindered proton is preferentially abstracted instead. As a result, the Hofmann product is typically favored when using bulky bases. When 2-Bromo-2-methyl butane is treated with potassium tert-butoxide instead of sodium ethoxide, the Hofmann product is favored.

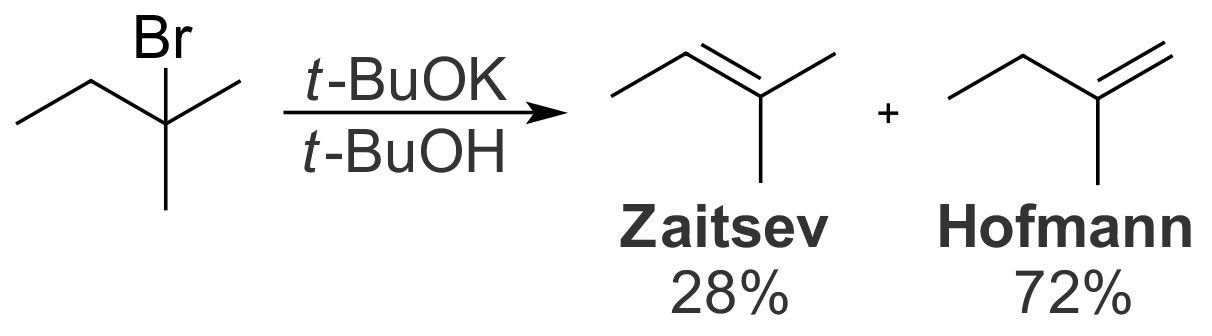

Steric interactions within the substrate also prevent the formation of the Zaytsev product. These intramolecular interactions are relevant to the distribution of products in the Hofmann elimination reaction, which converts amines to alkenes. In the Hofmann elimination, treatment of a quaternary ammonium iodide salt with silver oxide produces hydroxide ions, which act as a base and eliminate the tertiary amine to give an alkene.

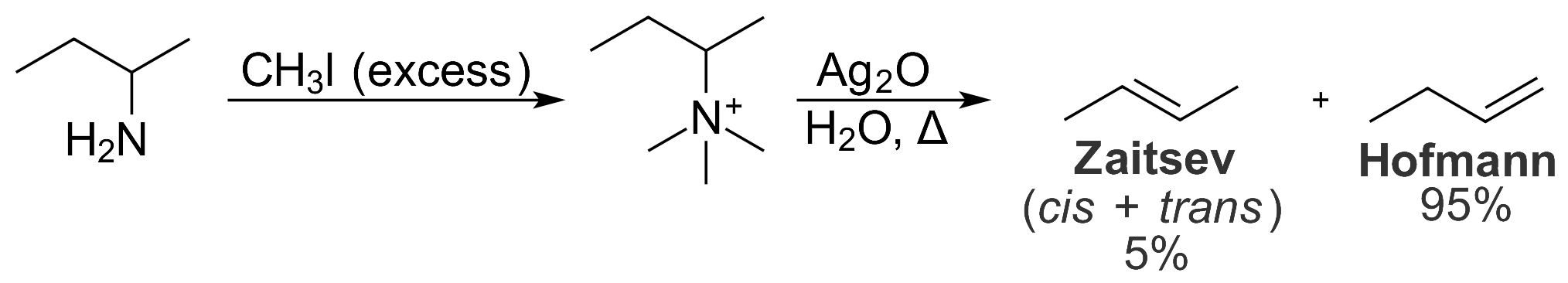

In the Hofmann elimination, the least substituted alkene is typically favored due to intramolecular steric interactions. The quaternary ammonium group is large, and interactions with alkyl groups on the rest of the molecule are undesirable. As a result, the conformation necessary for the formation of the Zaytsev product is less energetically favorable than the conformation required for the formation of the Hofmann product. As a result, the Hofmann product is formed preferentially. The Cope elimination is very similar to the Hofmann elimination in principle but occurs under milder conditions. It also favors the formation of the Hofmann product, and for the same reasons.

=== Stereochemistry ===
In some cases, the stereochemistry of the starting material can prevent the formation of the Zaytsev product. For example, when menthyl chloride is treated with sodium ethoxide, the Hofmann product is formed exclusively, but in very low yield:

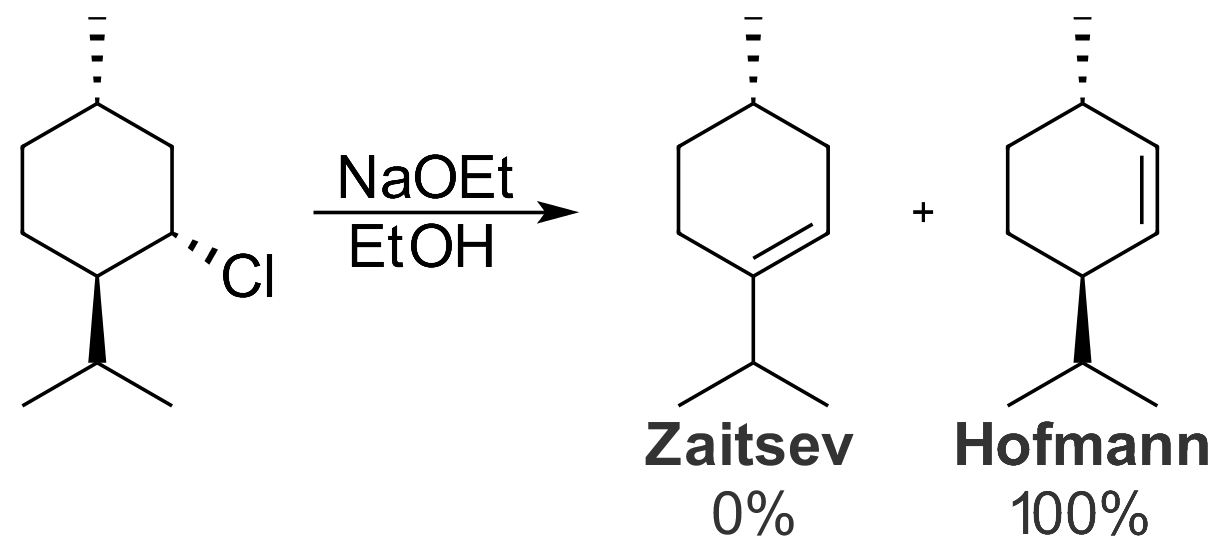

This result is due to the stereochemistry of the starting material. E2 eliminations require anti-periplanar geometry, in which the proton and leaving group lie on opposite sides of the C-C bond, but in the same plane. When menthyl chloride is drawn in the chair conformation, it is easy to explain the unusual product distribution.

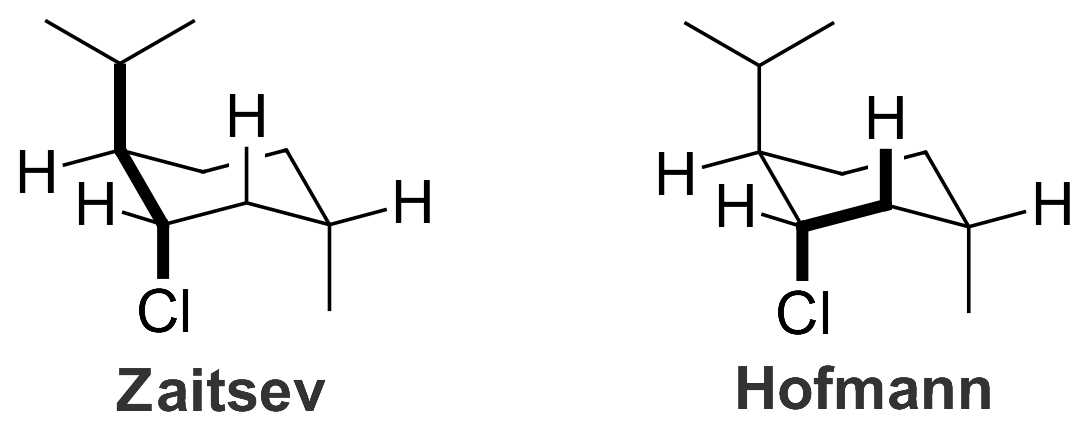

Formation of the Zaytsev product requires elimination at the 2-position, but the isopropyl group – not the proton – is anti-periplanar to the chloride leaving group; this makes elimination at the 2-position impossible. In order for the Hofmann product to form, elimination must occur at the 6-position. Because the proton at this position has the correct orientation relative to the leaving group, elimination can and does occur. As a result, this particular reaction produces only the Hofmann product.

== See also ==
- Markovnikov's rule
- Hofmann elimination
- Cope elimination

== Bibliography ==
- Wade, L. G. (2010). Organic Chemistry (7th ed.). Upper Saddle River, NJ: Pearson Education. ISBN 978-0321592316.
