= Chugaev elimination =

Chemical reaction

Named after	Lev Chugaev
Reaction type	Elimination reaction

Identifiers
RSC ontology ID	RXNO:0000538

The Chugaev elimination is a chemical reaction that involves the net removal of water from alcohols to produce alkenes. The intermediate is a xanthate. It is named for its discoverer, the Russian chemist Lev Chugaev, who first reported the reaction sequence in 1899.

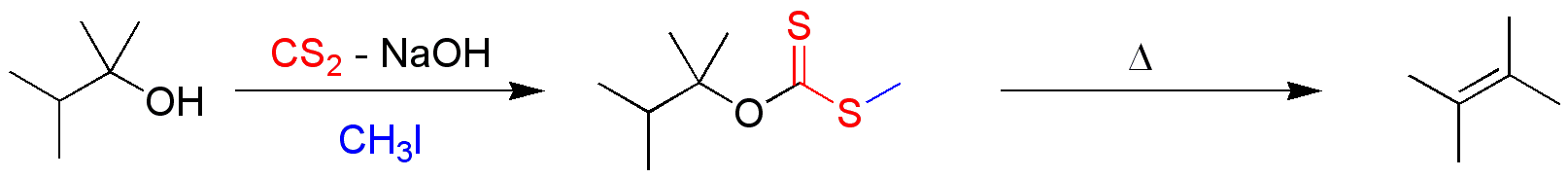

In the first step, a xanthate salt is formed out of the alkoxide and carbon disulfide (CS_{2}). With the addition of iodomethane, the alkoxide is transformed into a methyl xanthate ester. When heated to about 200 °C, this ester decomposed by an intramolecular elimination. In a 6-membered cyclic transition state the hydrogen atom is removed from the carbon atom β to the xanthate oxygen in a syn-elimination. The side product decomposes to carbonyl sulfide (OCS) and methanethiol.

The Chugaev elimination is similar in mechanism to other thermal elimination reactions such as the Cope elimination and ester pyrolysis. Xanthates typically undergo elimination from 120 to 200 °C, while esters typically require 400 to 500 °C and amine oxides routinely react between 80 and 160 °C. Thus, the decomposition of xanthates is advantageous because the milder conditions minimize side reactions, such as alkene isomerization.

In the development of Cram's rule, structural assignment of the reaction products were made by applying Chugaev elimination, wherein the threo isomer reacts to the cis isomer of -α-methyl-stilbene and the erythro isomer to the trans version.

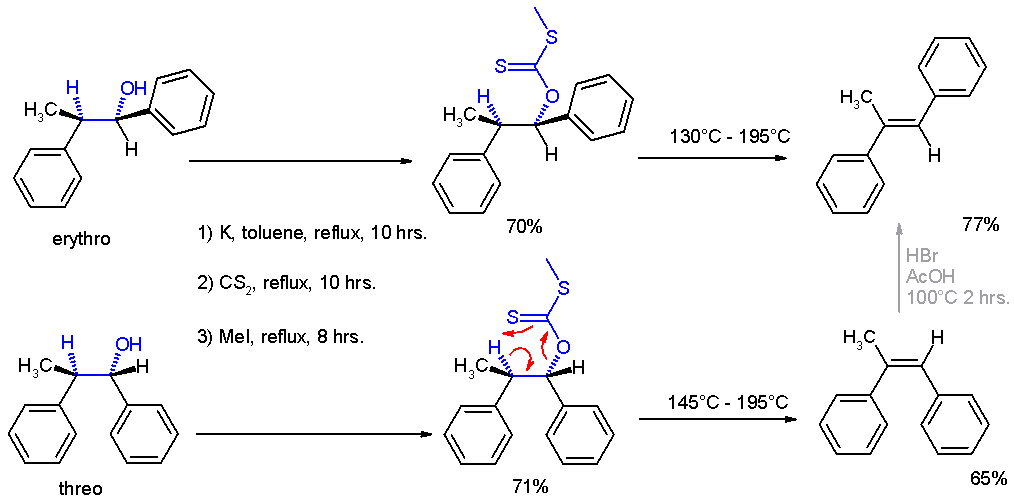

== See also ==
- Barton–McCombie deoxygenation
