= Grieco elimination =

Chemical reaction

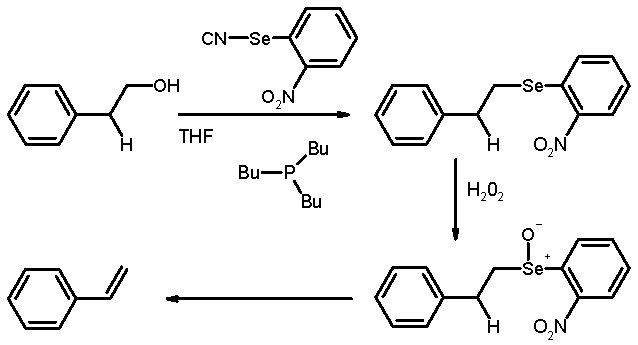
The Grieco elimination

The Grieco elimination is an organic reaction describing the elimination reaction of an aliphatic primary alcohol through a selenide to a terminal alkene. It is named for Paul Grieco.

The alcohol first reacts with o-nitrophenylselenocyanate and tributylphosphine to form a selenide via a nucleophilic substitution on the electron-deficient selenium. In the second step, the selenide is oxidized with hydrogen peroxide to give a selenoxide. This structure decomposes to form an alkene by an E_{i} elimination mechanism with expulsion of a selenol in a fashion similar to that of the Cope elimination. This reaction takes part in the synthesis of ring C of the Danishefsky Taxol synthesis.

The elimination step is common with the Clive-Reich-Sharpless olefination that uses PhSeX as the selenium source.
