= Lebedinsky =

Lebedinsky or Lebedinski is a surname. Notable persons with the surname include:

- Iaroslav Lebedynsky (born 1960), French historical writer
- Lev Lebedinsky (1904–1992), Soviet musicologist
- Mikołaj Lebedyński (born 1990), Polish soccer player
- Vyacheslav Lebedinsky (1888–1956), Soviet chemist
