= Viktor Kogan =

Russian chemist

Viktor Aleksandrovich Kogan
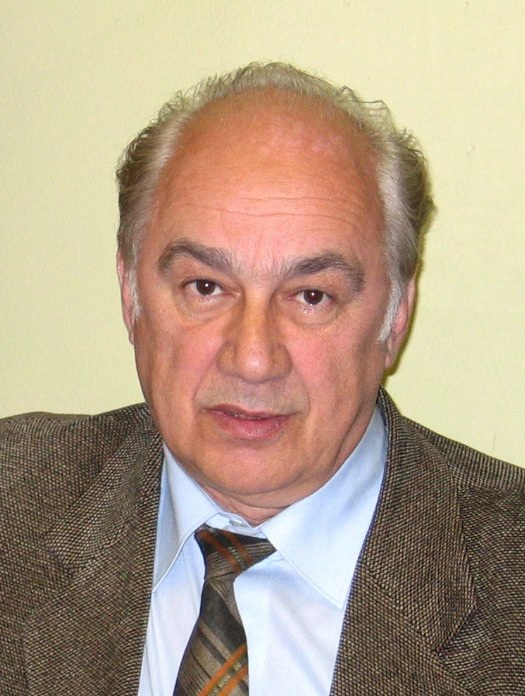
- Born: Viktor Aleksandrovich Kogan; Виктор Александрович Коган; 9 August 1936
- Died: 21 October 2014 (aged 78); Rostov on Don
- Occupation: chemist

Viktor Aleksandrovich Kogan (Russian: Виктор Александрович Коган; 9 August 1936 — 21 October 2014, Rostov-on-Don) was a Russian chemist. Professor, Doctor of Chemical Sciences.

== Biography ==
Viktor Aleksandrovich Kogan was born on 9 August 1936. In 1959 he graduated from the Chemical Faculty of Rostov State University. Since 1962 he worked at the RSU; since 1978 he was a Professor, in 1983—2014 he was the Head of the Department of Physical and Colloid Chemistry of the RSU (now Southern Federal University).

His main scientific works are devoted to the chemistry of coordination complex of transition metals with polyfunctional organic ligands, magnetochemistry of bi-and polynuclear exchange clusters — complexes of transition metals with hydrazones and Schiff bases.

Viktor Kogan was the author of 4 monographs and more than 600 papers and 40 invention certificates. He was a member of the editorial board of Russian Journal of Coordination Chemistry.

He was a laureate of the State Prize of the USSR (1989), winner of Prize of the Russian Academy of Sciences named after Lev Chugaev (2003) and an Honoured Scientist of the RSFSR.

He died in Rostov-on-Don on 21 October 2014, aged 78.

== Works ==
- Коган В. А., Зеленцов В. В., Ларин Г. М., Луков В. В. Комплексы переходных металлов с гидразонами. Физико-химические свойства и строение. — М.: Наука, 1990. — 112 с.
- Коган В. А., Луков В. В. Физическая химия: Курс лекций. — Ростов н/Д: Изд-во Рост. ун-та, 2006. — 256 с.
