= Sodium amalgam =

Alloy of mercury and sodium

Synthesis of sodium amalgam

Sodium amalgam, with the common formula Na(Hg), is an alloy of mercury and sodium. The term amalgam is used for alloys, intermetallic compounds, and solutions (both solid solutions and liquid solutions) involving mercury as a major component. Sodium amalgams are often used in reactions as strong reducing agents with better handling properties compared to solid sodium. They are less dangerously reactive toward water and in fact are often used as an aqueous suspension.

Sodium amalgam was used as a reagent as early as 1862. A synthesis method was described by J. Alfred Wanklyn in 1866.

== Structure and compositions ==
No particular formula is assigned to "sodium amalgam". Na_{5}Hg_{8} and Na_{3}Hg are well defined compounds. In sodium amalgams, the Hg-Hg distances are expanded to around 5 Å vs. about 3 Å for mercury itself. Usually amalgams are classified on the weight percent of sodium. Amalgams with 2% Na are solids at room temperature, whereas some more dilute amalgams remain liquid.

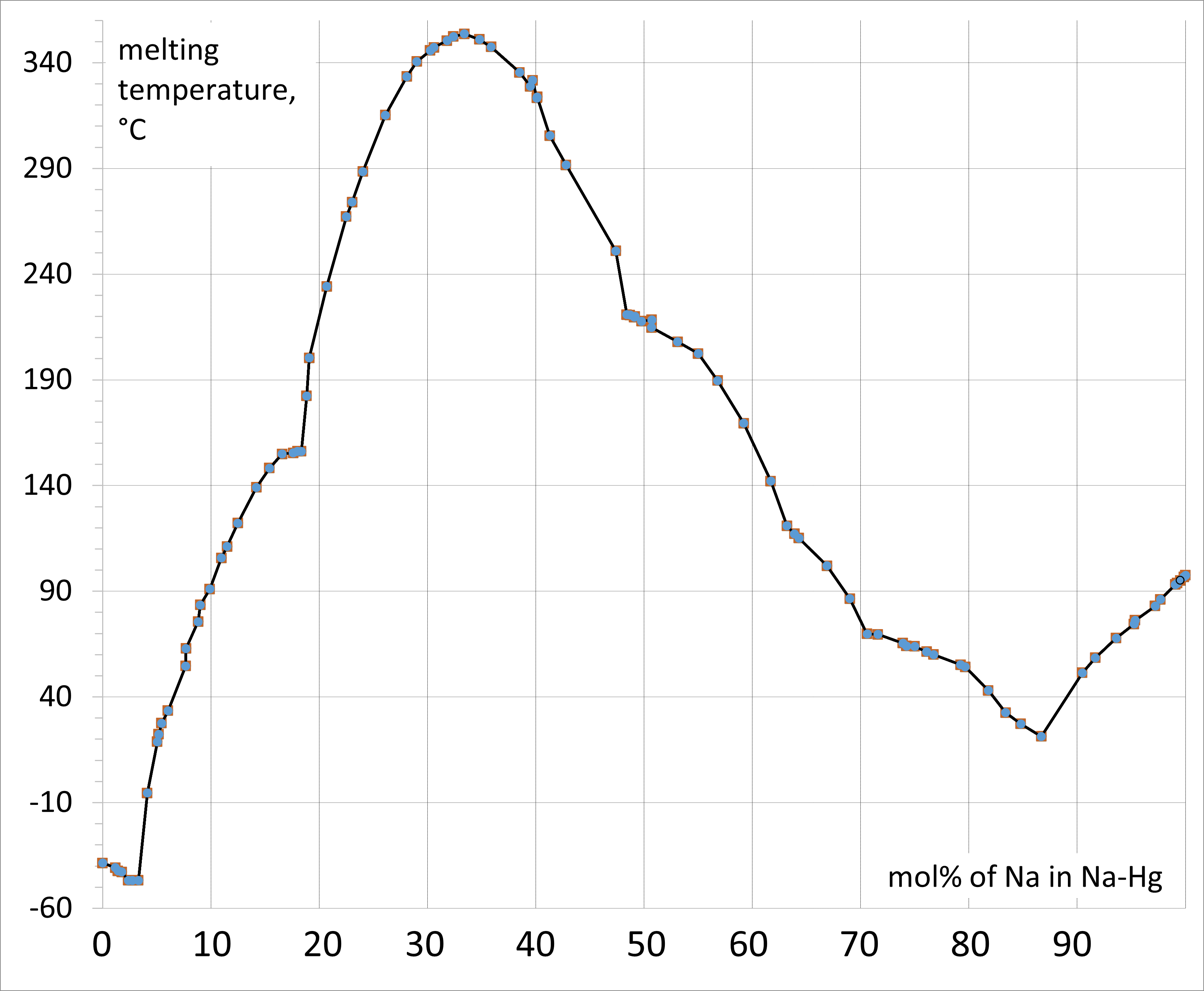
Phase diagram of sodium-mercury alloy system.

== Preparation ==
External videos
- Demonstration and commentary on the preparation of sodium amalgam
- via YouTube
- Mixing sodium with mercury (31 December 2018), by NileRed

Metallic sodium dissolves in mercury exothermically, i.e. with the release of heat, therefore, formation of sodium amalgam is famously dangerous for generating sparks. The process causes localised boiling of the mercury and for this reason the formation is usually conducted in a fume hood and often performed using air-free techniques, such as synthesis under anhydrous liquid paraffin. Sodium amalgam may be prepared in the laboratory by dissolving sodium metal in mercury or the reverse. Sodium amalgams can be purchased from chemical supply houses.

== Uses ==
Sodium amalgam has been used in organic chemistry as a powerful reducing agent, which is safer to handle than sodium itself. It is used in Emde degradation, and also for reduction of aromatic ketones to hydrols.

A sodium amalgam is used in the design of the high pressure sodium lamp providing sodium to produce the proper color, and mercury to tailor the electrical characteristics of the lamp.

=== Mercury cell electrolysis ===
Sodium amalgam is a by-product of chlorine made by mercury cell electrolysis. In this cell, brine (concentrated sodium chloride solution) is electrolysed between a liquid mercury cathode and a titanium or graphite anode. Chlorine is formed at the anode, while sodium formed at the cathode dissolves into the mercury, making sodium amalgam. Normally this sodium amalgam is drawn off and reacted with water in a "decomposer cell" to produce hydrogen gas, concentrated sodium hydroxide solution, and mercury to be recycled through the process. In principle, all the mercury should be completely recycled, but inevitably a small portion goes missing. Because of concerns about this mercury escaping into the environment, the mercury cell process is generally being replaced by plants which use a less toxic cathode.
