= Emde degradation =

Chemical reaction

Named after	Hermann Emde
Reaction type	Degradation reaction

Identifiers
RSC ontology ID	RXNO:0000147

The Emde degradation (also Emde reaction or Emde reduction) is the radical dealkylation of a quaternary ammonium cation with sodium.

Depending on reaction conditions, the product may be an alkene (identical to the Hofmann elimination) or an alkane:

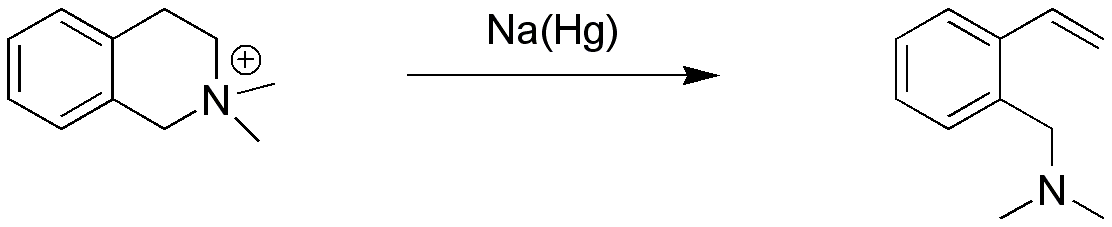

Generally, sodium amalgam gives the alkene product and Birch conditions the alkane (but these are only rules of thumb; the picture above is correct). From this a radical mechanism is inferred, evolving hydrogen gas in the alkene case. Otherwise little is known about the mechanism.

The organic reaction was first described in 1909 by the German chemist Hermann Emde. It was for a long time of great importance in structure elucidation of many alkaloids, for example that of ephedrine.

Alternative reducing agents exist for this reaction; for instance, lithium aluminium hydride, or hydrogen gas with a catalytic noble metal.

== See also ==
- Related reactions are the Hofmann elimination and the von Braun reaction
