= Lev Chugaev =

Russian chemist (1873–1922)

Lev Aleksandrovich Chugaev
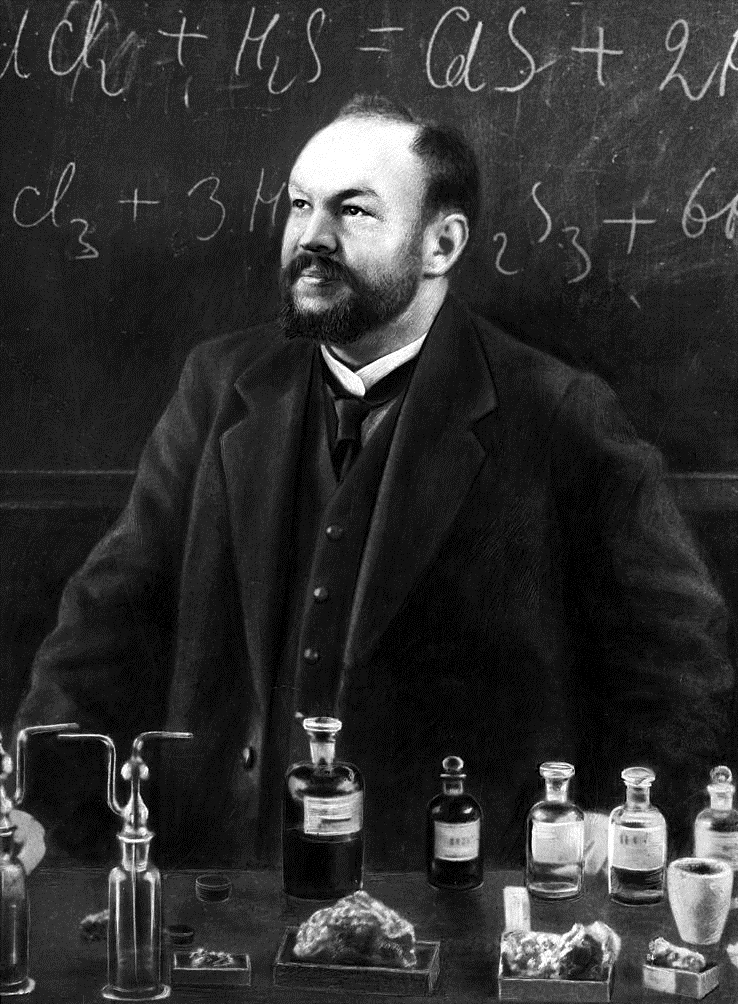
- Born: 16 October 1873; Moscow, Russian Empire
- Died: 26 September 1922 (aged 48); Gryazovets, Russian SFSR
- Education: University of Moscow
- Known for: Chugaev reaction
- Scientific career
- Workplaces: University of Moscow; University of Saint Petersburg
- Doctoral students: Vyacheslav Lebedinsky

Lev Aleksandrovich Chugaev (Russian: Лев Алекса́ндрович Чуга́ев; 16 October 1873 – 26 September 1922) was a Russian chemist. At the height of his career, he was professor of chemistry at the University of Petersburg, being the successor to Dmitri Mendeleev. He was active in the fields of inorganic chemistry, especially platinum group complexes, as well as organic chemistry. He is also known as Leo Aleksandrovich Tschugaeff or Tschugaev.

== Contributions to coordination chemistry ==
Chugaev discovered that dimethylglyoxime forms a scarlet solid upon reaction with nickel(II) ions. This reaction was one of the first "spot tests" for a metal ion. An adherent to the theories of Alfred Werner, Chugaev made several contributions to the chemistry of platinum. The salt [Pt(NH_{3})_{5}Cl]Cl_{3} containing the chloropentammineplatinum(IV) ion, is called "Chugaev's salt". Other complexes prepared in his laboratory include [Pt(SEt_{2})_{4}][PtCl_{4}], [Pt(NH_{3})_{5}OH]Cl_{3}, [Os(SC(NH_{2})_{2})_{6}]Cl_{3}^{.}H_{2}O.

Chugaev also studied complexes of hydrazine. One of his complexes, since also called Chugaev's salt, was the product of the reaction of platinum(II) salts with methyl isocyanide and hydrazine. After many decades, this compound was shown to be a carbene complex, probably the first metal carbene complex ever reported.

== Contributions to organic chemistry ==
He discovered the Chugaev reaction during his work on thujene and terpene.
