= Ligand isomerism =

Presence of structurally isomeric ligands in a coordination complex

In coordination chemistry, ligand isomerism is a type of structural isomerism in coordination complexes which arises from the presence of ligands which can adopt different isomeric forms. 1,2-Diaminopropane and 1,3-Diaminopropane are the examples that each feature a different isomer would be ligand isomers.
