= Vyacheslav Lebedinsky =

Vyacheslav Vasilyevich Lebedinsky (Russian: Вячеслав Васильевич Лебединский; 14 September 1888 – 12 December 1956) was a Russian and Soviet chemist who worked on platinum, rhodium and iridium, their extraction and use in catalysis. He also worked on complex compounds of rhodium and iridium. He was also a noted teacher and guided 20 doctoral students in inorganic chemistry.

Lebedinsky was born in Saint Petersburg. He graduated from high school in 1907 and went to St. Petersburg University. Graduating in 1913 with a thesis on anomalous rotatory dispersion he stayed on at the department of inorganic chemistry and studied under Lev Chugaev. He also examined complex metal chemistry and synthesized four forms of ammonium derivatives with trivalent rhodium. He became a professor in 1920 and moved to Moscow in 1935 to work at the Moscow Institute of Non-Ferrous Metals and Gold. He developed a method for the extraction of thee metals from copper-nickel sludge, for which he received the Stalin Prize in 1946. He studied platinum catalysis for disinfection of drinking water, and the treatment of waste water. He worked on rhodium extraction and purification and the synthesis of complex compounds of rhenium and ethylene diamine.
