= 2,4,6-Tris(dimethylaminomethyl)phenol =

Aromatic organic chemical

Names
- IUPAC name 2,4,6-Tris[(dimethylamino)methyl]phenol

Identifiers
CAS Number	90-72-2
3D model (JSmol)	Interactive image
ChEMBL	ChEMBL1887090
ChemSpider	6759
ECHA InfoCard	100.001.831
EC Number	202-013-9
PubChem CID	7026
UNII	2AGN35QF4W
UN number	2735
CompTox Dashboard (EPA)	DTXSID5026548
- InChI: InChI=1S/C15H27N3O/c1-16(2)9-12-7-13(10-17(3)4)15(19)14(8-12)11-18(5)6/h7-8,19H,9-11H2,1-6H3 Key: AHDSRXYHVZECER-UHFFFAOYSA-N
- SMILES: CN(C)CC1=CC(=C(C(=C1)CN(C)C)O)CN(C)C

Properties
Chemical formula	C_{15}H_{27}N_{3}O
Molar mass	265.401 g·mol^{−1}
Density	0.974 at 15°C

Hazards
- GHS labelling
Pictograms	(GHS05: Corrosive) (GHS07: Exclamation mark)
Signal word	Danger
Hazard statements	H302, H315, H319
Precautionary statements	P260, P264, P264+P265, P270, P272, P273, P280, P301+P317, P301+P330+P331, P302+P352, P302+P361+P354, P304+P340, P305+P351+P338, P305+P354+P338, P316, P317, P321, P330, P333+P317, P337+P317, P362+P364, P363, P405, P501
- Except where otherwise noted, data are given for materials in their standard state (at 25 °C [77 °F], 100 kPa). Infobox references

2,4,6-Tris(dimethylaminomethyl)phenol is an aromatic organic chemical that has tertiary amine and phenolic hydroxyl functionality in the same molecule. The formula is C_{15}H_{27}N_{3}O and the CAS Registry Number is 90-72-2. It is REACH registered and the European Community Number is 202-013-9.

== Uses ==
A key use is as a catalyst for epoxy resin chemistry. It can be used as a homopolymerization catalyst for epoxy resins and also as an accelerator with epoxy resin curing agents. It is then further used in coatings, sealants, composites, adhesives and elastomers. It has been stated that it is probably the most widely used room temperature accelerator for two-component epoxy resin systems. The kinetics of curing with and without this accelerator have been extensively studied. It is the usual benchmark or control used when other catalysts and accelerators are being developed and tested.

In addition to its use in epoxy chemistry, it is also used in polyurethane chemistry for example by grafting the molecule into the polymer backbone. It is also used as a trimerization catalyst with polymeric MDI.

Polyether ether ketones may also be grafted with the molecule which then finds use in lithium batteries.

The high functionality of the molecule means it can be used to complex some transition metals and this has also been studied.

Often cited weaknesses are yellowing and odor.

== Manufacture ==
The material is a Mannich base and is manufactured by reacting phenol, formaldehyde and dimethylamine in a reactor under vacuum and removing the water produced.

== Toxicity ==
It is classed as a high volume chemical and as such, its toxicity profile has been extensively studied.
