= Hofmann elimination =

Chemical reaction in organic chemistry

Named after	August Wilhelm von Hofmann
Reaction type	Elimination reaction

Identifiers
Organic Chemistry Portal	hofmann-elimination
RSC ontology ID	RXNO:0000166

Hofmann elimination is an elimination reaction of an amine to form alkenes. The least stable alkene (the one with the fewest substituents on the carbons of the double bond), called the Hofmann product, is formed. This tendency, known as the Hofmann alkene synthesis rule, is in contrast to usual elimination reactions, where Zaitsev's rule predicts the formation of the most stable alkene. It is named after its discoverer, August Wilhelm von Hofmann.

The reaction starts with the formation of a quaternary ammonium iodide salt by treatment of the amine with excess methyl iodide (exhaustive methylation), followed by treatment with silver oxide and water to form a quaternary ammonium hydroxide. When this salt is decomposed by heat, the Hofmann product is preferentially formed due to the steric bulk of the leaving group causing the hydroxide to abstract the more easily accessible hydrogen.

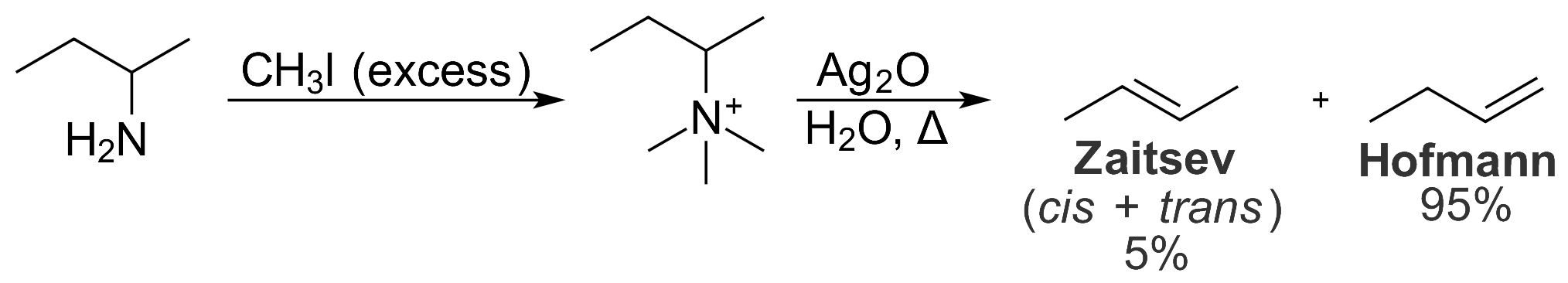

In the Hofmann elimination, the least substituted alkene is typically favored due to intramolecular steric interactions. The quaternary ammonium group is large, and interactions with alkyl groups on the rest of the molecule are undesirable. As a result, the conformation necessary for the formation of the Zaitsev product is less energetically favorable than the conformation required for the formation of the Hofmann product. As a result, the Hofmann product is formed preferentially. The Cope elimination is very similar to the Hofmann elimination in principle, but occurs under milder conditions. It also favors the formation of the Hofmann product, and for the same reasons.

An example of a Hofmann elimination (not involving a contrast between a Zaitsev product and a Hofmann product) is the synthesis of trans-cyclooctene. The trans isomer is selectively trapped as a complex with silver nitrate (in this diagram the trans form looks like a cis form, but see the trans-cyclooctene article for better images):

In a related chemical test, known as the Herzig–Meyer alkimide group determination, a tertiary amine with at least one methyl group and lacking a beta-proton is allowed to react with hydrogen iodide to the quaternary ammonium salt which when heated degrades to methyl iodide and the secondary amine.

== See also ==
- Cope elimination
- Emde degradation
