= C10H9NO3S =

The molecular formula C_{10}H_{9}NO_{3}S (molar mass: 223.25 g/mol, exact mass: 223.0303 u) may refer to:

- Aminonaphthalenesulfonic acids
  - Naphthionic acid
  - Tobias acid (2-amino-1-naphthalenesulfonic acid)
