= Urech =

Urech is a surname. Notable people with the surname include:

- Christine Urech (born 1984), Swiss curler
- Friedrich Urech (1844–1904), German chemist
- Lisa Urech (born 1989), Swiss hurdler

See also

- Urech hydantoin synthesis, it was named after Friedrich Urech, who published the reaction in 1873
