= Hydantoin =

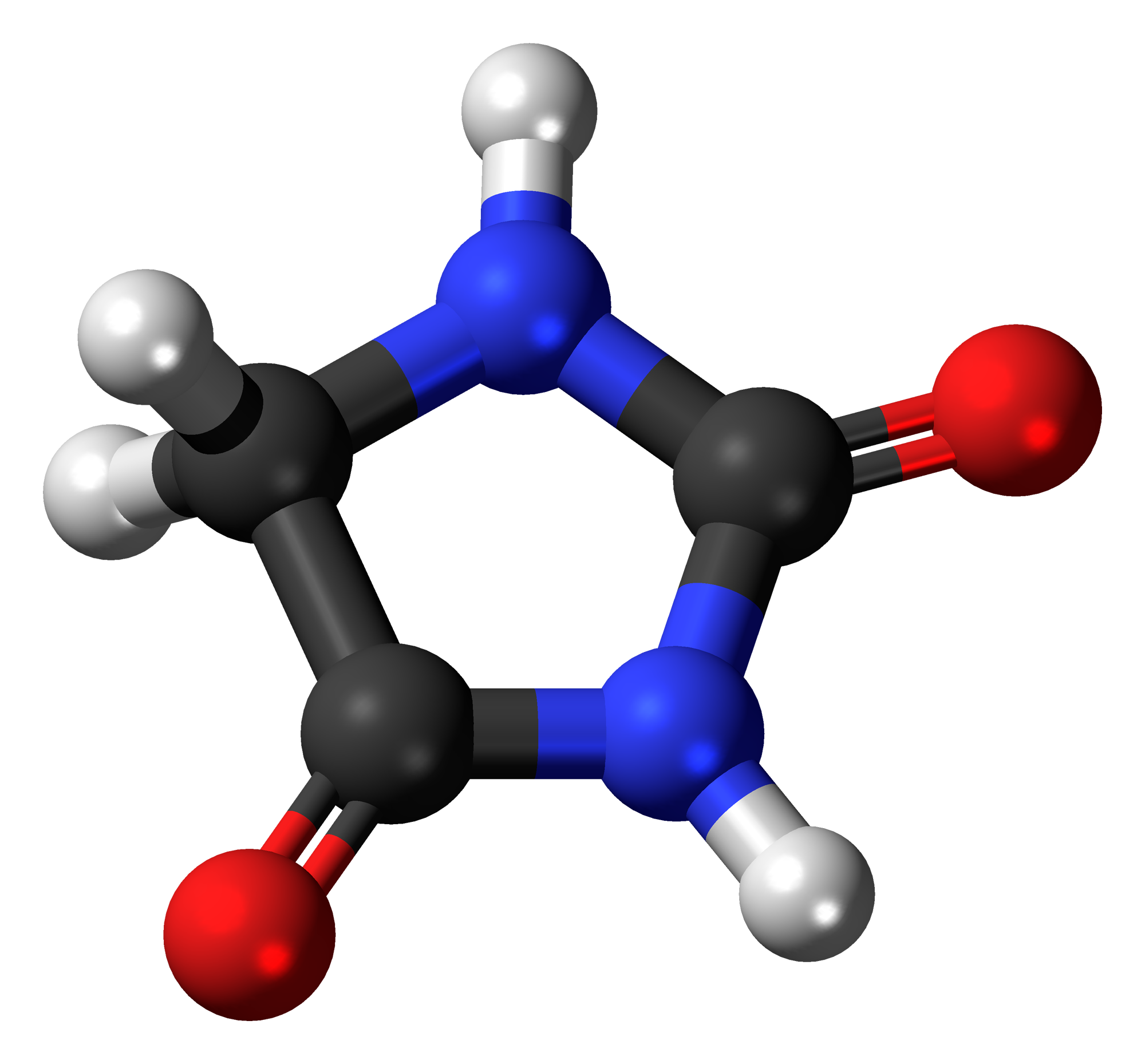

Names
- Preferred IUPAC name Imidazolidine-2,4-dione

Identifiers
CAS Number	461-72-3
3D model (JSmol)	Interactive image
ChEBI	CHEBI:27612
ChEMBL	ChEMBL122334
ChemSpider	9612
ECHA InfoCard	100.006.650
KEGG	C05146
PubChem CID	10006
UNII	I6208298TA
CompTox Dashboard (EPA)	DTXSID1052111
- InChI: InChI=1S/C3H4N2O2/c6-2-1-4-3(7)5-2/h1H2,(H2,4,5,6,7) Key: WJRBRSLFGCUECM-UHFFFAOYSA-N; InChI=1/C3H4N2O2/c6-2-1-4-3(7)5-2/h1H2,(H2,4,5,6,7) Key: WJRBRSLFGCUECM-UHFFFAOYAD
- SMILES: O=C1NC(=O)NC1

Properties
Chemical formula	C_{3}H_{4}N_{2}O_{2}
Molar mass	100.077 g·mol^{−1}
Melting point	220 °C (428 °F; 493 K)
Solubility in water	39.7 g/l (100 °C)
- Except where otherwise noted, data are given for materials in their standard state (at 25 °C [77 °F], 100 kPa). verify (what is ?) Infobox references

Hydantoin, or glycolylurea, is a heterocyclic organic compound with the formula CH_{2}C(O)NHC(O)NH. It is a colorless solid that arises from the reaction of glycolic acid and urea. It is an oxidized derivative of imidazolidine. In a more general sense, hydantoins can refer to groups or a class of compounds with the same ring structure as the parent compound. For example, phenytoin (mentioned below) has two phenyl groups substituted onto the number 5 carbon in a hydantoin molecule.

== Synthesis ==
Hydantoin was first isolated in 1861 by Adolf von Baeyer in the course of his study of uric acid. He obtained it by hydrogenation of allantoin, hence the name.

Friedrich Urech synthesized 5-methylhydantoin in 1873 from alanine sulfate and potassium cyanate in what is now known as the Urech hydantoin synthesis. The method is very similar to the modern route using alkyl and arylcyanates. The 5,5-dimethyl compound can also be obtained from acetone cyanohydrin (also discovered by Urech: see cyanohydrin reaction) and ammonium carbonate. This reaction type is called the Bucherer–Bergs reaction.

Hydantoin can also be synthesized either by heating allantoin with hydroiodic acid or by "heating bromacetyl urea with alcoholic ammonia". The cyclic structure of hydantoins was confirmed by Dorothy Hahn 1913.

Of practical importance, hydantoins are obtained by condensation of a cyanohydrin with ammonium carbonate. Another useful route, which follows the work of Urech, involves the condensation of ⍺-amino acids or ⍺-amino esters with cyanates and isocyanates:

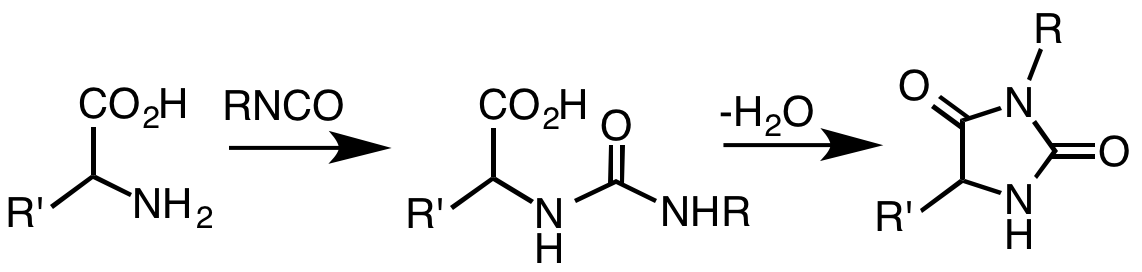

== Uses and occurrence ==
=== Pharmaceuticals ===
The hydantoin group can be found in several medicinally important compounds. In pharmaceuticals, hydantoin derivatives form a class of anticonvulsants; phenytoin and fosphenytoin both contain hydantoin moieties and are both used as anticonvulsants in the treatment of seizure disorders. The hydantoin derivative dantrolene is used as a muscle relaxant to treat malignant hyperthermia, neuroleptic malignant syndrome, spasticity, and ecstasy intoxication. Ropitoin is an example of an antiarrhythmic hydantoin.

=== Pesticides ===
The hydantoin derivative Imiprothrin is a pyrethroid insecticide. Iprodione is a popular fungicide containing the hydantoin group.

=== Synthesis of amino acids ===
Hydrolysis of hydantoins affords amino acids:

RCHC(O)NHC(O)NH + H_{2}O → RCHC(NH_{2})COOH + NH_{3}

Hydantoin itself reacts with hot, dilute hydrochloric acid to give glycine. Methionine is produced industrially via the hydantoin obtained from methional.

=== Methylation ===
Methylation of hydantoin yields a variety of derivatives. Dimethylhydantoin (DMH) may refer to any dimethyl derivative of hydantoin, but especially 5,5-dimethylhydantoin.

=== Halogenation ===
Some N-halogenated derivatives of hydantoin are used as chlorinating or brominating agents in disinfectant/sanitizer or biocide products. The three major N-halogenated derivatives are dichlorodimethylhydantoin (DCDMH), bromochlorodimethylhydantoin (BCDMH), and dibromodimethylhydantoin (DBDMH). A mixed ethyl-methyl analogue, 1,3-dichloro-5-ethyl-5-methylimidazolidine-2,4-dione (bromochloroethylmethylhydantoin), is also used in mixtures with the above.

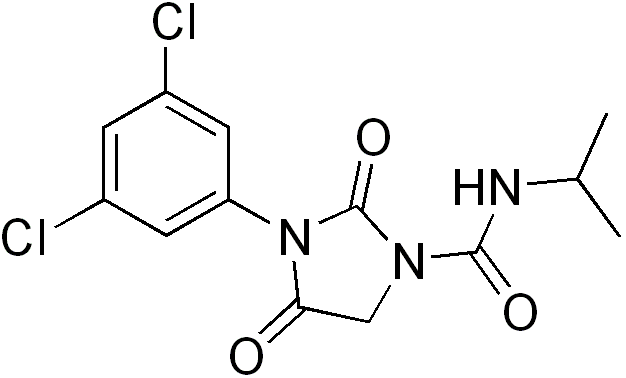
Iprodione is a popular fungicide containing the hydantoin group.

=== DNA oxidation to hydantoins after cell death ===
A high proportion of cytosine and thymine bases in DNA are oxidized to hydantoins over time after the death of an organism. Such modifications block DNA polymerases and thus prevents PCR from working. Such damage is a problem when dealing with ancient DNA samples.

== External links and further reading ==
- Ware, Elinor (1950). "The Chemistry of the Hydantoins". Chem. Rev. 46 (3): 403–470. doi:10.1021/cr60145a001. PMID 24537833.
- English Translation of 1926 German review article on the Preparation of hydantoins by Heinrich Biltz and Karl Slotta
