= Bucherer–Bergs reaction =

Chemical reaction

| Named after | Hans Theodor Bucherer; Hermann Bergs |
| Reaction type | Ring forming reaction |

Identifiers
| Organic Chemistry Portal | bucherer-bergs-reaction |

The Bucherer–Bergs reaction is the chemical reaction of carbonyl compounds (aldehydes or ketones), either in combination with potassium cyanide or converted to their cyanohydrin derivative, with ammonium carbonate to give hydantoins. The reaction is named after Hans Theodor Bucherer.

The Bucherer-Bergs reaction

== Reaction mechanism ==
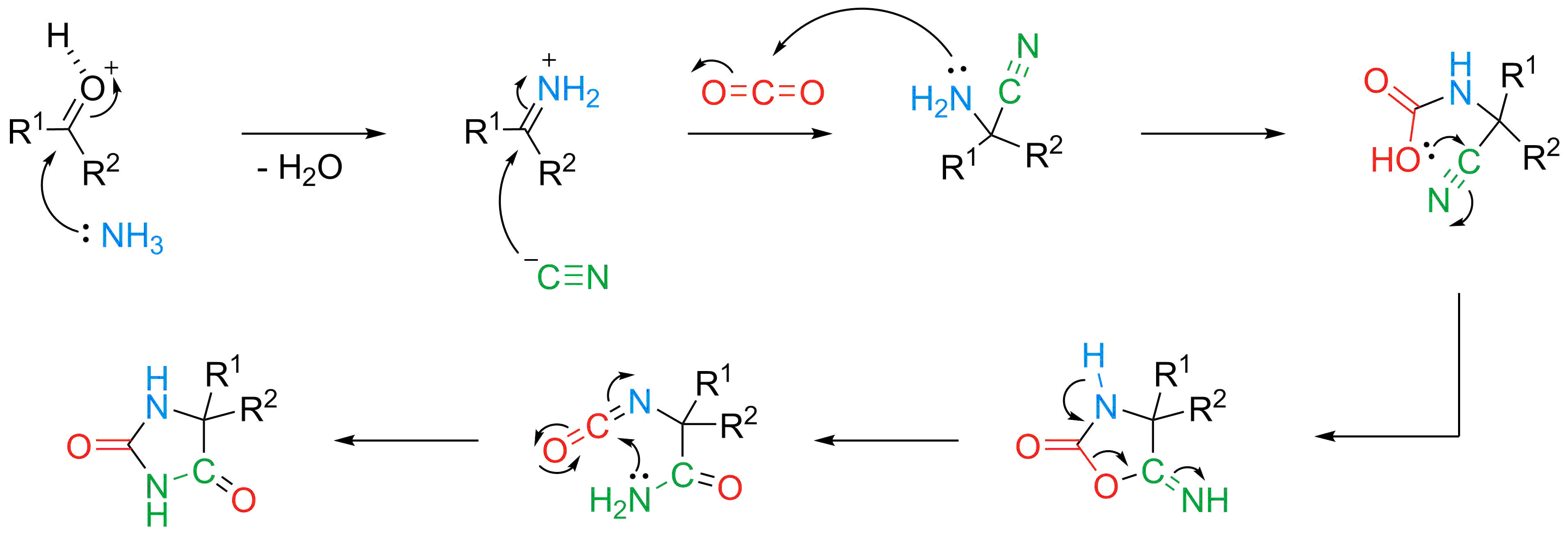
Reaction mechanism for the Bucherer–Bergs reaction

Following condensation of the carbonyl with the ammonium, the formed imine is attacked by the isocyanide to form the aminonitrile. Nucleophilic addition of aminonitrile to CO_{2} leads to cyano-carbamic acid, which undergoes an intramolecular ring closing to 5-imino-oxazolidin-2-one. The 5-imino-oxazolidin-2-one rearranges to form the hydantoin product via an isocyanate intermediate.

== History ==
Reactions similar to the Bucherer–Bergs reaction were first seen in 1905 and 1914 by Ciamician and Silber, who obtained 5,5-dimethylhydantoin from a mixture of acetone and hydrocyanic acid after it had been exposed to sunlight for five to seven months. In 1929, Bergs issued a patent that described his own synthesis of a number of 5-substituted hydantoins. Bucherer improved on Bergs’ method, finding that lower temperatures and pressures for the reaction were permissible. Bucherer and Steiner also found that cyanohydrins would react just as well as carbonyl compounds to produce hydantoins. Later, Bucherer and Lieb found that 50% alcohol was an effective solvent for the reaction. With this solvent, aldehydes reacted well, and ketones gave excellent yields. In 1934 Bucherer and Steiner proposed a mechanism for the reaction. While there were some issues with the mechanism, it was mostly accurate.

== Limitations ==
One limitation of the Bucherer–Bergs reactions is that it only has one point of diversity. Only changes in the structure of the starting ketone or aldehyde will lead to variations in the final hydantoin.

One way to increase the number of points of diversity is by combining a reaction with 2-Methyleneaziridine with the Bucherer–Bergs reaction in a one-pot synthesis. First, the reaction of 2-Methyleneaziridine 1 with Grignard reagent, catalytic Cu(I), and R^{2}-X causes the 2-Methyleneaziridine to ring open and form a ketimine 2. The ketimine is then subjected to the Bucherer-Bergs reagents, resulting in a 5,5'- disubstituted hydantoin 3. This reaction has three points of chemical diversity as the structure of the aziridine starting compound, the organometallic reagent, and the electrophile can all be varied to synthesize a different hydantoin.

== Improvements ==
One improvement on the Bucherer–Bergs reaction has been the use of ultrasonication. More recently, many organic reactions have been accelerated by ultrasonic irradiation. In the past, the Bucherer–Bergs reaction has had problems with polymerization, long reaction time, and difficult work-up. 5,5-disubstituted hydantoins can be prepared using the Bucherer–Bergs reaction under ultrasonication. Compared with reports in the literature, this makes so the reaction can be carried out at a lower temperature, have a shorter reaction time, a higher yield, and a more simple work-up.

== Variations ==
One variation of the Bucherer–Bergs reaction is the treatment of carbonyl compound with carbon disulfide and ammonium cyanide in methanol solution to form 2,4-dithiohydantoins. In addition, the reaction of ketones with ammonium monothiocarbamate and sodium cyanide will yield 5,5-disubstituted 4-thiohydantoins.

== Stereospecificity ==
In some cases, the carbonyl starting material can be sufficiently sterically biased so a single stereoisomer is observed. However, in other cases, there is no selectivity at all, resulting in a 1:1 ratio of stereoisomers. An example taken from "Name Reactions: Heterocyclic Chemistry" by Jie Jack Li shows a case of stereospecificity in the Bucherer–Bergs reaction. While the end product of the Bucherer–Bergs reaction is a hydantoin, the hydantoin can undergo hydrolysis to form an amino acid. This is what is assumed in the example below. For comparison, the amino acid product for the Strecker synthesis has also been included.

== Applications ==
The hydantoins formed by the Bucherer–Bergs reaction have many useful applications. They:

- are useful in carbohydrate chemistry.
- are important heterocyclic scaffolds that induce biological effects.
- are useful precursors to amino acids, e. g. methionine.
- have pharmacological importance (ex. 5,5-diphenylhydantoin, also known as Dilantin)

== See also ==
- Urech hydantoin synthesis
- Strecker amino acid synthesis
