= Dorothy Hahn =

American organic chemist

Dorothy Anna Hahn
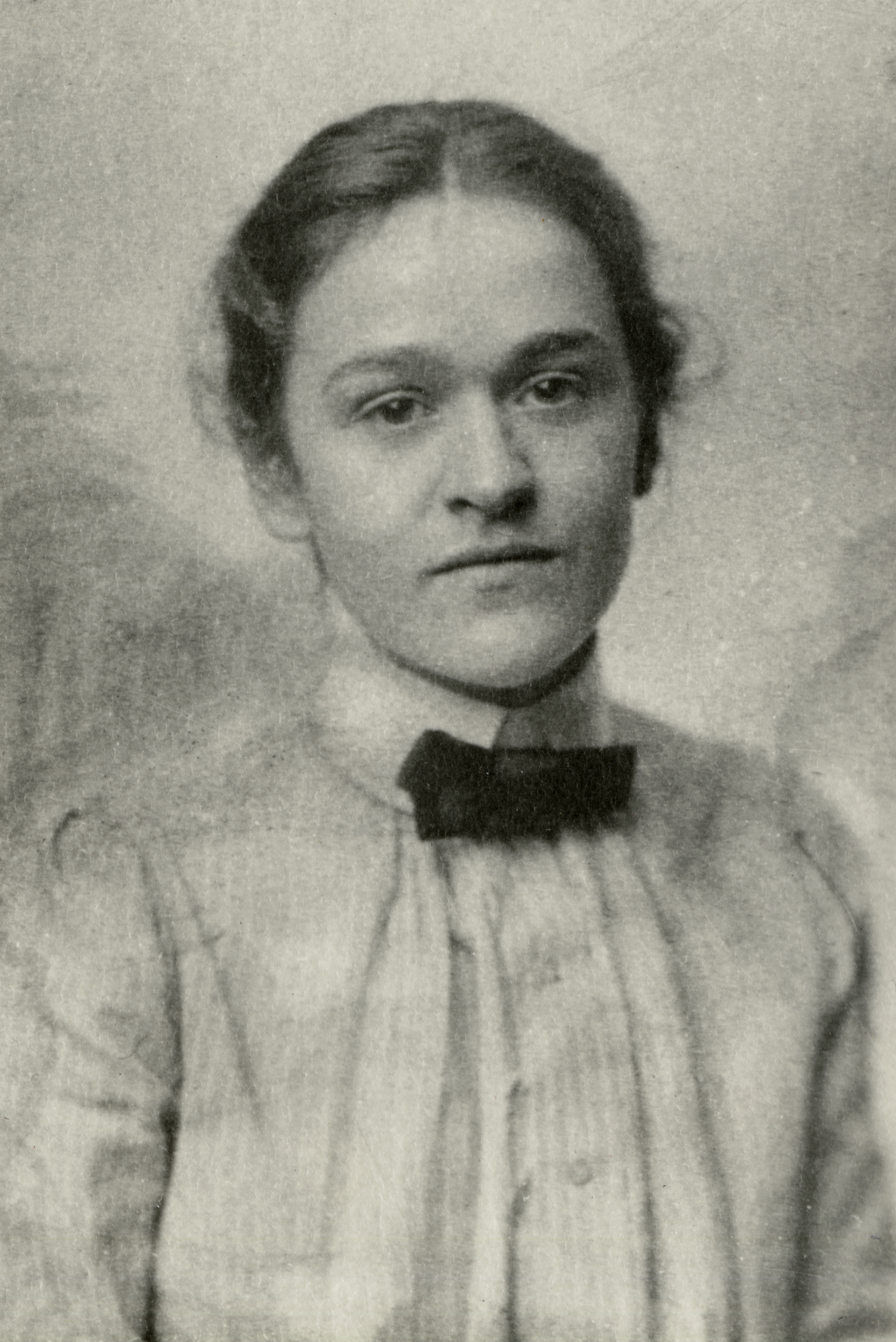
- Young Dorothy Hahn, ca. 1890s
- Born: April 9, 1876; Philadelphia, PA
- Died: 1950 (74 years old)
- Education: Byrn Mawr College (A.B.) University of Leipzig Yale University (Ph.D.)
- Known for: hydantoins

Dorothy Anna Hahn (1876–1950) was a lifelong educator and American professor of organic chemistry at Mount Holyoke College. She was most known for her research which utilized the then newly developed technique of ultraviolet spectroscopy to study hydantoins.

== Biography ==
Dorothy Hahn was born on April 9, 1876, in Philadelphia, Pennsylvania, as the second of two daughters born to Mary Beaver and Carl S. Hahn, a German immigrant and teacher. She received extensive academic training in chemistry and was an instructor at numerous women's colleges across the United States. In 1908 she established her independent research group at Mount Holyoke College, publishing numerous scientific journal articles and books. In addition, Hahn worked in the private sector as an industrial chemist focusing on coal tar research. In 1941 she retired. Outside of her professional life, Dorothy enjoyed traveling and spent her summers at Noank on the Connecticut coast, where she became a keen sailor. She died in 1950 at the age of 74.

== Education and employment ==
In 1894, Hahn graduated from Miss Florence Baldwin's School for Girls, Preparatory for Bryn Mawr College, now known as Baldwin School. She went on to attend Bryn Mawr College, earning a bachelor's degree in both chemistry and biology in 1899. Upon completion, she became a professor and taught chemistry at the Pennsylvania College for Women, now known as Chatham University in Pittsburgh, Pennsylvania, and remained there until 1906. Concurrently, Hahn taught biology at the Pittsburgh and Allegheny Kindergarten College from 1904 to 1906. Driven by a desire to further her research interests, she undertook studies in organic chemistry at the University of Leipzig from 1906 to 1907. She then returned to the United States to continue her research at her alma mater, Bryn Mawr College, with a postdoctoral fellowship, from 1907 to 1908. In 1908, Hahn became a member of the faculty at Mount Holyoke College where she spent the remainder of her career. After publishing her first paper in 1913, she was promoted to associate professor. From 1915 to 1916 Dorothy conducted research into the relationship between electrons and chemical valence in collaboration with Treat Baldwin Johnson at Yale University as an American Association of University Women fellow and earned her Ph.D. in 1916. She continued her work on cyclic polypeptide hydantoins in her independent career and was promoted to full professor in 1918. Dorothy retired in 1941 after mentoring and preparing numerous women for graduate studies.

== Major contributions and achievements ==
In 1913 Hahn published her first paper, entitled Saturated δ-Ketonic Esters and their Derivatives, confirming the ring structure of hydantoins utilizing ultraviolet spectrophotometry techniques developed by her colleague Emma Perry Carr. Her research resulted in over 30 publications in journals such as the Journal of the American Chemical Society, one of which was titled "Synthesis of the Polypeptide-Hydantoin: Tyrosylalanine-Hydantoin. II." During her time as a professor, she coauthored several books alongside other notable authors such as Arthur Messinger Comey. These books included A Dictionary of Chemical Solubilities, Inorganic (1921), The Catalytic Oxidation of Organic Compounds in the Vapor Phase (1932) and Pyrimidines: Their Amino and Aminoxy Derivatives (1933). She also participated in translating and enlarging Ferdinand Henrich's Theories of Organic Chemistry. Hahn also maintained a membership in the American Chemical Society and the Deutsche Chemische Gesellschaft. She also was a member of Sigma Xi and the American Association of University Women.

Outside of academia, Hahn showed interest in industrial chemistry and conducted research on coal tar products in the private sector. These pursuits allowed Mount Holyoke to gain funds for new facilities and scholarships. To celebrate her contributions, Mount Holyoke College furnished a seminar room in her honor within the then new chemistry building.
