= Adolph Strecker =

German chemist (1822–1871)

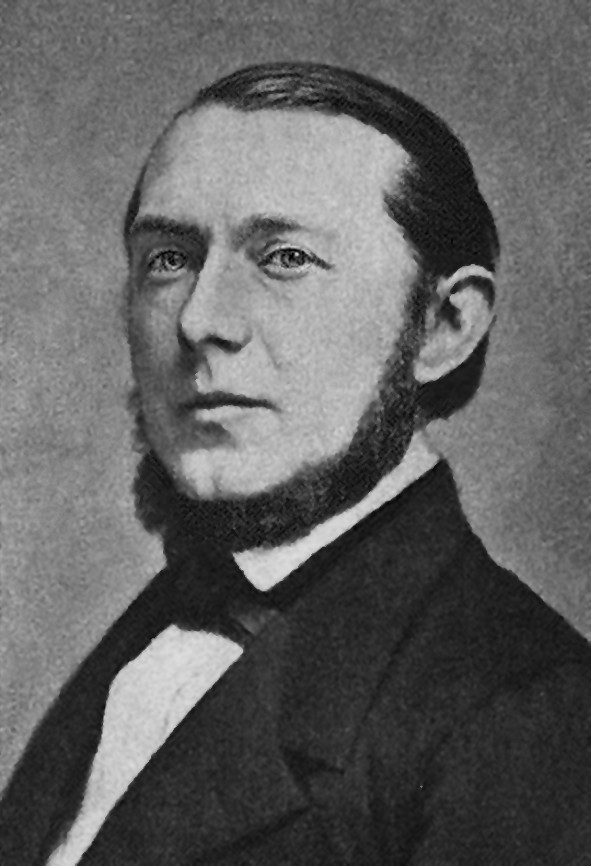
- Born: Friederich Adolph Ludwig Ewald Strecker; 21 October 1822; Darmstadt, German Confederation
- Died: 7 November 1871 (aged 49); Würzburg, German Empire
- Education: University of Giessen
- Known for: Strecker synthesis of amino acids, Strecker degradation
- Scientific career
- Workplaces: University of Giessen; University of Christiania; University of Tübingen; University of Würzburg
- Doctoral advisor: Justus Liebig

Adolph Strecker (21 October 1822 – 7 November 1871) was a German chemist who is known primarily for his work with amino acids.

== Life and work ==
Strecker was born in Darmstadt, the son of Friedrich Ludwig Strecker, an archivist working for the Grand Duke of Hesse, and Henriette Amalie Johannette Koch. Adolph Strecker attended school in Darmstadt until 1838 when he changed to the higher Gewerbeschule. After receiving his abitur in 1840, Strecker began studying science at the University of Giessen, where Justus Liebig was a professor. In August 1842, Strecker received his PhD and began teaching at a realschule in Darmstadt. He refused one offer to work for Liebig, but in 1846 he accepted another and became Liebig's private assistant at the University of Giessen. Strecker finished his habilitation in 1848 and became a lecturer at the university.

Strecker investigated a wide variety of problems in both organic and inorganic chemistry during his time at Giessen. Examples include the molecular masses of silver and carbon, the reactions of lactic acid, the decomposition of hippuric acid by nitric acid, and the separation of cobalt and nickel.

Strecker wanted to leave Giessen for a position at the University of Berlin, but when he heard of an open position at Norway's University of Christiania, he applied for it and in 1851 became a professor there. While in Norway, Strecker focused on organic chemistry, covering a broad range of topics from organometallic chemistry to natural products.

Strecker left Norway on Christian Gottlob Gmelin's death in 1860 to accept the latter's position at the University of Tübingen. There he conducted research on guanine, xanthine, caffeine, and theobromine, and on the very toxic thallium oxides, which damaged his health severely. He moved to the University of Würzburg in 1870, but his first semester was interrupted by the Franco-Prussian War of 1870–1871. Strecker became an officer during the war and returned to the university after it, where he started his last semester. In the summer of 1871 he undertook a recreational holiday in Berchtesgaden, Bavaria, but his health began to deteriorate. Strecker died in Würzburg, where he is buried in the Hauptfriedhof.

== Strecker synthesis ==
The Strecker synthesis of amino acids involves the reaction of potassium cyanide, ammonium chloride, and an aldehyde to make an alpha amino acid. The reaction can also be run with ammonia, hydrogen cyanide, and an aldehyde.

The Strecker amino acid synthesis

Because of the relative simplicity of the reactants, the Strecker synthesis has been invoked by those studying both the origin of life and meteoritic amino acids.

Also named for Strecker are the Strecker degradation, which involves the conversion of amino acids into imines and then to aldehydes, and the Strecker sulfite alkylation.

== Notable people who taught Strecker ==
- Justus von Liebig (1803–1873)

== Notable students of Strecker ==
- Georg Zehfuss (de) (1832–1901)

== Family ==
Strecker, while serving as a professor in Norway, returned to Germany for several holidays. During one such visit to Darmstadt, Strecker, on July 3, 1852, married Karoline Auguste Natalie Weber (1852–1853), who died 16 months later – on October 13, 1853. She had given birth on October 2, 1853, to Friederike Caroline Sophie Christiane Natalie Strecker. Adolph Stecker married a second time on September 29, 1855.
