= Bucherer carbazole synthesis =

Chemical reaction

Named after	Hans Theodor Bucherer
Reaction type	Ring forming reaction

The Bucherer carbazole synthesis is a chemical reaction used to synthesize carbazoles from 2-naphthols and aryl hydrazines using sodium bisulfite. The reaction is named after Hans Theodor Bucherer.

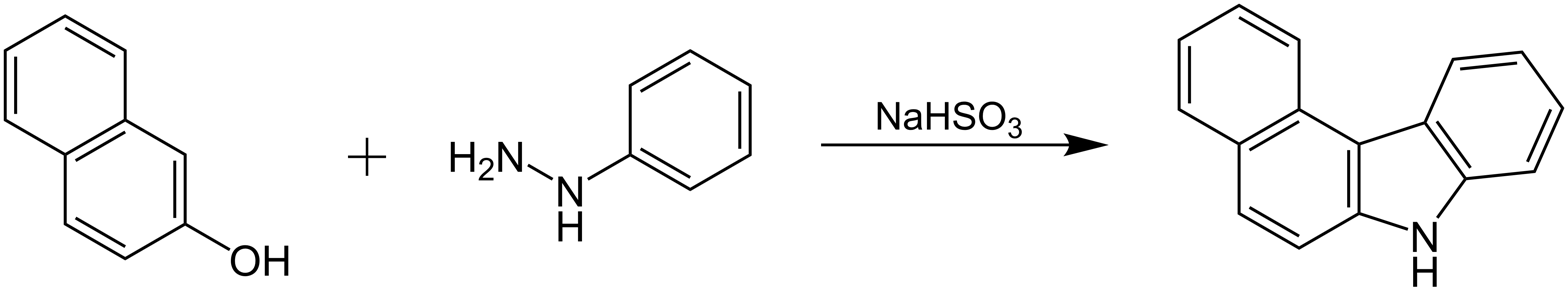
The Bucherer carbazole synthesis

== See also ==
- Borsche-Drechsel cyclization
- Bucherer reaction
