= 1-Naphthylamine =

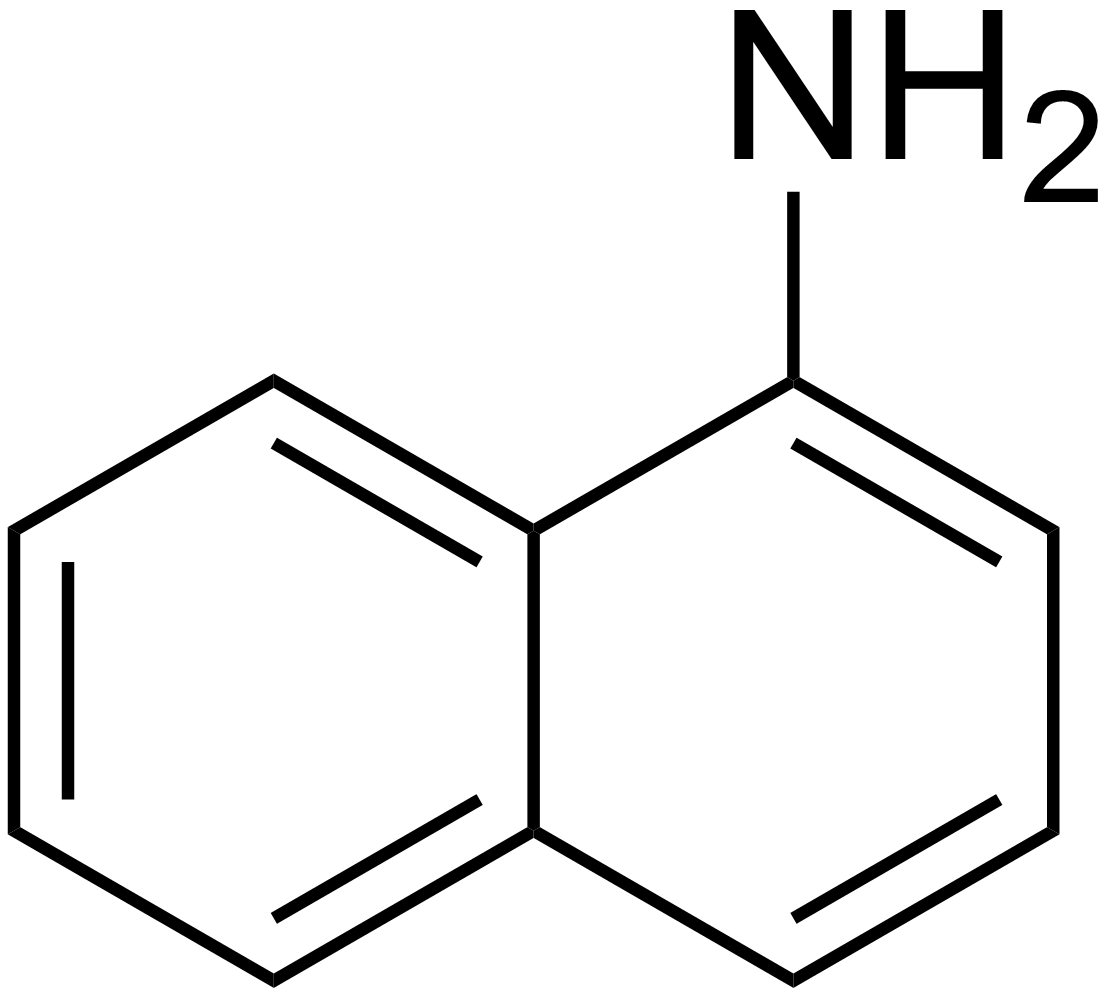
- Skeletal formula

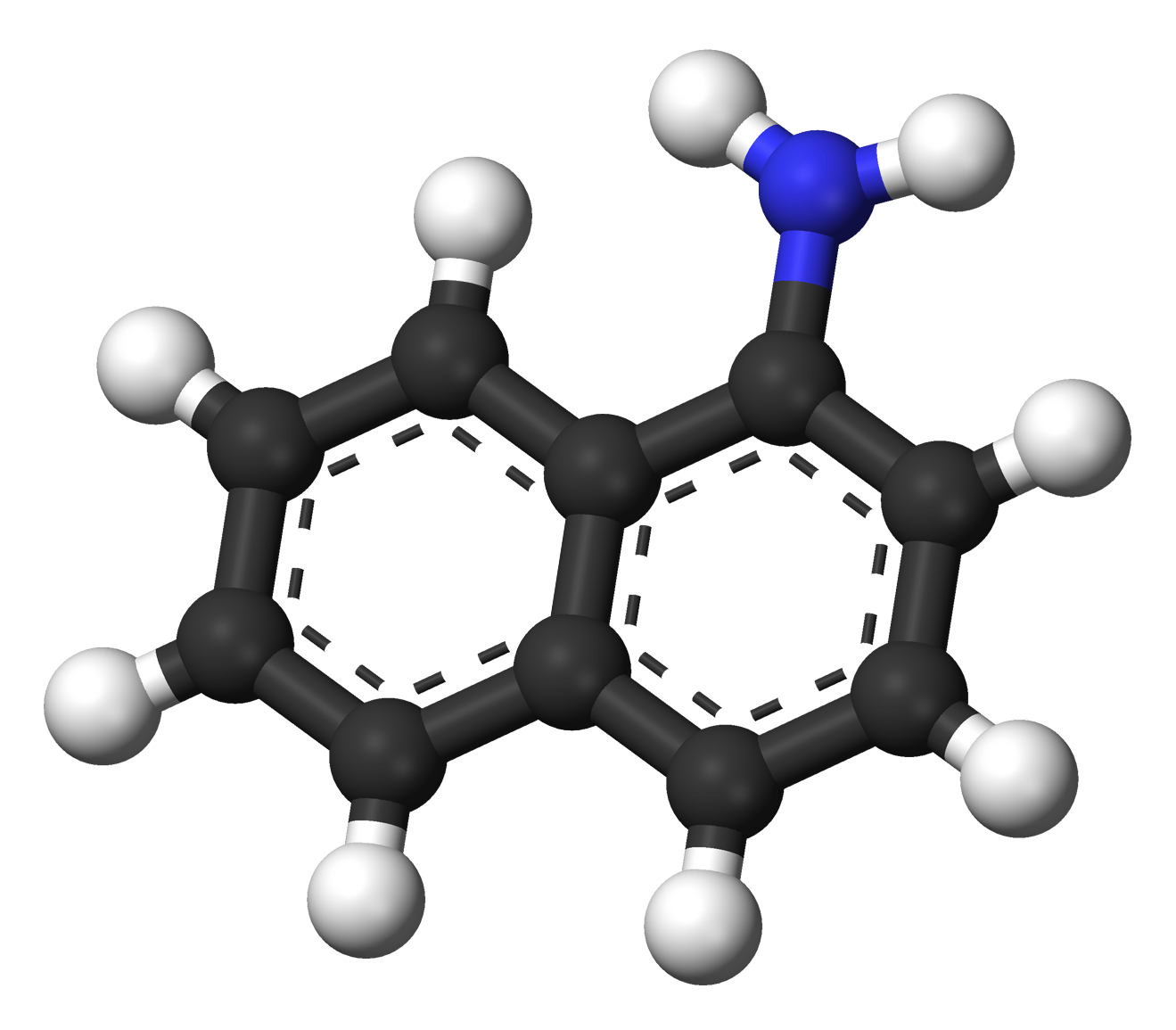
- Ball-and-stick model

Names
- Preferred IUPAC name Naphthalen-1-amine
- Other names (Naphthalen-1-yl)amine; 1-Naphthylamine α-Naphthylamine; 1-Aminonaphthalene

Identifiers
CAS Number	134-32-7
3D model (JSmol)	Interactive image
ChEBI	CHEBI:50450
ChEMBL	ChEMBL57394
ChemSpider	8319
ECHA InfoCard	100.004.672
KEGG	C14790
PubChem CID	8640
UNII	9753I242R5
CompTox Dashboard (EPA)	DTXSID7020920
- InChI: InChI=1S/C10H9N/c11-10-7-3-5-8-4-1-2-6-9(8)10/h1-7H,11H2 Key: RUFPHBVGCFYCNW-UHFFFAOYSA-N; InChI=1/C10H9N/c11-10-7-3-5-8-4-1-2-6-9(8)10/h1-7H,11H2 Key: RUFPHBVGCFYCNW-UHFFFAOYAD
- SMILES: Nc1c2ccccc2ccc1

Properties
Chemical formula	C_{10}H_{9}N
Molar mass	143.19 g/mol
Appearance	Colorless crystals (reddish-purple in air)
Odor	ammonia-like
Density	1.114 g/cm^{3}
Melting point	47 to 50 °C (117 to 122 °F; 320 to 323 K)
Boiling point	301 °C (574 °F; 574 K)
Solubility in water	0.002% (20°C)
Vapor pressure	1 mmHg (104°C)
Magnetic susceptibility (χ)	−98.8·10^{−6} cm^{3}/mol; −127.6·10^{−6} cm^{3}/mol (HCl salt)

Hazards
Flash point	157 °C; 315 °F; 430 K
- Safety data sheet (SDS)

Related compounds
Related compounds	2-Naphthylamine; 1-Naphthol; Naphthalene; Aniline; 1,8-Bis(dimethylamino)naphthalene
- Except where otherwise noted, data are given for materials in their standard state (at 25 °C [77 °F], 100 kPa). verify (what is ?) Infobox references

1-Naphthylamine is an aromatic amine derived from naphthalene. It can cause bladder cancer (transitional cell carcinoma). It crystallizes in colorless needles which melt at 50 °C. It possesses a disagreeable odor, sublimes readily, and turns brown on exposure to air. It is the precursor to a variety of dyes.

== Preparation and reactions ==
It can be prepared by reducing 1-nitronaphthalene with iron and hydrochloric acid followed by steam distillation.

Oxidizing agents, such as ferric chloride, give a blue precipitate with solutions of its salts. Chromic acid converts it into 1,4-naphthoquinone. Sodium in boiling amyl alcohol reduces the unsubstituted ring, giving tetrahydro-1-naphthylamine. This tetrahydro compound yields adipic acid when oxidized by potassium permanganate.

At 200 °C in sulfuric acid, it converts to 1-naphthol.

== Use in dyes ==
The sulfonic acid derivatives of 1-naphthylamine are used for the preparation of azo dye. These compounds possess the important property of dyeing unmordanted cotton.

An important derivative is naphthionic acid (1-aminonaphthalene-4-sulfonic acid), which is produced by heating 1-naphthylamine and sulfuric acid to 170–180 °C in the presence of crystallized oxalic acid. It forms small needles, very sparingly soluble in water. Upon treatment with the bis(diazonium) derivative of benzidine, 1-aminonaphthalene-4-sulfonic acid gives Congo red.

== Other Uses ==
- Used in preparation of the rodenticide Antu [86-88-4] and the herbicide Naptalam [132-66-1].

Also: naptalam, aptiganel.

== Safety ==
It is listed as one of the 13 carcinogens covered by the OSHA General Industry Standards.
