= Hans Theodor Bucherer =

German chemist (1869–1949)

- Born: 19 May 1869
- Died: 29 May 1949 (aged 80)
- Education: Leipzig University
- Known for: Bucherer carbazole synthesis, Bucherer reaction, Bucherer–Bergs reaction
- Scientific career
- Workplaces: BASF, Technische Hochschule Dresden, Technische Hochschule Charlottenburg, Technische Hochschule München
- Doctoral advisor: Johannes Wislicenus

Hans Theodor Bucherer (19 May 1869 – 29 May 1949) was a German chemist and gave name to several chemical reactions, for example the Bucherer carbazole synthesis, the Bucherer reaction, and the Bucherer–Bergs reaction

== Life ==
Bucherer started studying chemistry at the Ludwig-Maximilians-Universität München, the University of Karlsruhe (TH) and later with Johannes Wislicenus at Leipzig University. After he received his Ph.D. in 1893, he worked at BASF. He became professor at the Technische Hochschule Dresden (now TU Dresden) in 1901, changed to the Technische Hochschule Charlottenburg (now Technische Universität Berlin) in 1913 and became professor at the Technische Hochschule München (now Technical University of Munich) in 1926.
