= Tobias acid =

Names
- Preferred IUPAC name 2-Aminonaphthalene-1-sulfonic acid
- Other names 2-Naphthylamine-1-sulfonic acid

Identifiers
CAS Number	81-16-3
3D model (JSmol)	Interactive image
ChEMBL	ChEMBL3182507
ChemSpider	6418
ECHA InfoCard	100.001.211
EC Number	201-331-5
PubChem CID	6670
UNII	F9QKW1FCE0
CompTox Dashboard (EPA)	DTXSID7020922
- InChI: InChI=1S/C10H9NO3S/c11-9-6-5-7-3-1-2-4-8(7)10(9)15(12,13)14/h1-6H,11H2,(H,12,13,14) Key: GWIAAIUASRVOIA-UHFFFAOYSA-N
- SMILES: C1=CC=C2C(=C1)C=CC(=C2S(=O)(=O)O)N

Properties
Chemical formula	C_{10}H_{9}NO_{3}S
Molar mass	223.25 g·mol^{−1}
- Except where otherwise noted, data are given for materials in their standard state (at 25 °C [77 °F], 100 kPa). Infobox references

Tobias acid (2-amino-1-naphthalenesulfonic acid) is an organic compound with the formula C_{10}H_{6}(SO_{3}H)(NH_{2}). It is named after the German chemist Georg Tobias. It is one of several aminonaphthalenesulfonic acids, which are derivatives of naphthalene containing both amine and sulfonic acid functional groups. It is a white solid, although commercial samples can appear otherwise. It is used in the synthesis of azo dyes such as C.I. Acid Yellow 19 and C.I. Pigment Red 49. It is prepared via the Bucherer reaction of 2-hydroxynaphthalene-1-sulfonic acid with ammonia and ammonium sulfite.
