= 5,5-Dimethylhydantoin =

Names
- IUPAC name 4,4-Dimethyl-2,5-dioxoimidazolidine

Identifiers
CAS Number	77-71-4
3D model (JSmol)	Interactive image
ChEBI	CHEBI:183672
ChEMBL	ChEMBL3181806
ChemSpider	6246
ECHA InfoCard	100.000.957
EC Number	201-051-3
PubChem CID	6491
UNII	34032MQ9RO
CompTox Dashboard (EPA)	DTXSID5021754
- InChI: InChI=1S/C5H8N2O2/c1-5(2)3(8)6-4(9)7-5/h1-2H3,(H2,6,7,8,9) Key: YIROYDNZEPTFOL-UHFFFAOYSA-N
- SMILES: CC1(C(=O)NC(=O)N1)C

Properties
Chemical formula	C_{5}H_{8}N_{2}O_{2}
Molar mass	128.131 g·mol^{−1}
Melting point	174–176 °C (345–349 °F; 447–449 K)
Solubility	very soluble in ethanol, ether, acetone, benzene, chloroform soluble in DMSO
log P	-0.48
Vapor pressure	0.0000028 mmHg
Acidity (pK_{a})	9.19
- Except where otherwise noted, data are given for materials in their standard state (at 25 °C [77 °F], 100 kPa). Infobox references

5,5-Dimethylhydantoin (DMH, systematic name 4,4-dimethyl-2,5-dioxoimidazolidine) is a derivative of hydantoin having two methyl groups as substituents on the ring carbon. DMH can be used in silver electroplating baths as an alternative to cyanide. It can be formed by hydrolysis of 1,3-dibromo-5,5-dimethylhydantoin and remaining as a detectable residue on foods that have not been properly washed. It can be easily produced by a Bucherer–Bergs reaction, warming a mixture of acetone cyanohydrin and ammonium carbonate.

Reaction of DMH with various halogens gives N,N′-dihalo derivatives, such as diido-5,5-dimethylhydantoin, bromochloro-5,5-dimethylhydantoin, and dibromo-5,5-dimethylhydantoin, which can be used as reagents to supply of electrophilic halogen atoms or hypohalous acids (or synthetic equivalents of them). Sodium 4,4-dimethyl-2,5-dioxoimidazolidin-1-ide, the sodium salt of its conjugate base, has been commercialized as a stabilizer for active chlorine in the papermaking industry.

== See also ==
- Cyanuric acid, another N-heterocyclic compound used for stabilizing halogens
