= Bucherer reaction =

Chemical reaction

The Bucherer reaction in organic chemistry is the reversible conversion of a naphthol to a naphthylamine in the presence of ammonia and sodium bisulfite. The reaction is widely used in the synthesis of dye precursors aminonaphthalenesulfonic acids.

C_{10}H_{7}-2-OH + NH_{3} ⇌ C_{10}H_{7}-2-NH_{2} + H_{2}O

The French chemist Robert Lepetit was the first to discover the reaction in 1898. The German chemist Hans Theodor Bucherer (1869–1949) discovered (independent from Lepetit) its reversibility and its potential especially in industrial chemistry. Bucherer published his results in 1904 and his name is connected to this reaction. The organic reaction also goes by the name Bucherer-Lepetit reaction or (incorrectly) the Bucherer-Le Petit reaction.

The reaction is used to convert 1,7-dihydroxynaphthalene into 7-amino-1-naphthol and 1-aminonaphthalene-4-sulfonic acid into 1-hydroxynaphthalene-4-sulfonic acid. It is also useful for transamination reactions of 2-aminonaphthalenes.

== Mechanism ==
In the first step of the reaction mechanism a proton adds to C2 or C4 of naphthol:

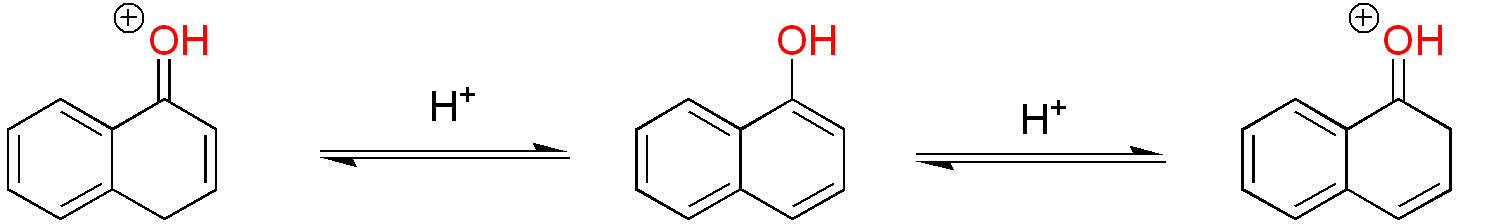

This dearomatization occurs at the expense of 25 kcal/mol. In the next step, bisulfite adds to C3, leading to the sulfonic acid. Displacement of sulfonate group by the amine gives naphthylamine. The amination is reversible. The reaction is summarized as follows:

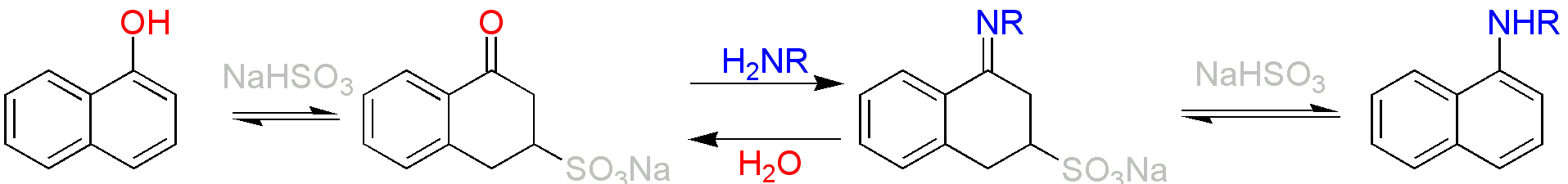

The Bucherer carbazole synthesis is a related reaction.
