= Strecker amino acid synthesis =

Method for the synthesis of amino acids

Strecker synthesis
Named after	Adolph Strecker
Reaction type	Substitution reaction

Identifiers
Organic Chemistry Portal	strecker-synthesis
RSC ontology ID	RXNO:0000207

The Strecker amino acid synthesis, also known simply as the Strecker synthesis, is a method for the synthesis of amino acids by the reaction of an aldehyde with cyanide in the presence of ammonia. The condensation reaction yields an α-aminonitrile, which is subsequently hydrolyzed to give the desired amino acid. The method is used for the commercial production of racemic methionine from methional.

Primary and secondary amines also give N-substituted amino acids. Likewise, the usage of ketones, instead of aldehydes, gives α,α-disubstituted amino acids.

== Reaction mechanism ==
In the first part of the reaction process, the carbonyl is converted to an iminium, to which a cyanide ion adds. First, the carbonyl oxygen of an aldehyde is protonated, followed by a nucleophilic attack of ammonia to the carbonyl carbon. After subsequent proton exchange, water is cleaved to form the iminium ion intermediate. A cyanide ion then attacks the iminium carbon yielding an aminonitrile.

Mechanism of the Strecker-Synthesis, part 1.

In the second part of the reaction process, the nitrile is hydrolyzed. First, the nitrile nitrogen of the aminonitrile is protonated, and the nitrile carbon is attacked by a water molecule. A 1,2-diamino-diol is then formed after proton exchange and a nucleophilic attack of water to the former nitrile carbon. Ammonia is subsequently eliminated after the protonation of the amino group, and finally the deprotonation of a hydroxyl group produces an amino acid.

Mechanism of the Strecker synthesis

== Asymmetric Strecker reactions ==
One example of the Strecker synthesis is a multikilogram scale synthesis of an L-valine derivative starting from methyl isopropyl ketone:

(CH_{3})_{2}CHC(O)CH_{3} + HCN + NH_{3} → (CH_{3})_{2}CHC(CN)(NH_{2})CH_{3} + H_{2}O

The initial reaction product of 3-methyl-2butanone with sodium cyanide and ammonia is resolved by application of L-tartaric acid. In contrast, asymmetric Strecker reactions require no resolving agent. By replacing ammonia with (S)-alpha-phenylethylamine as chiral auxiliary the ultimate reaction product was chiral alanine.

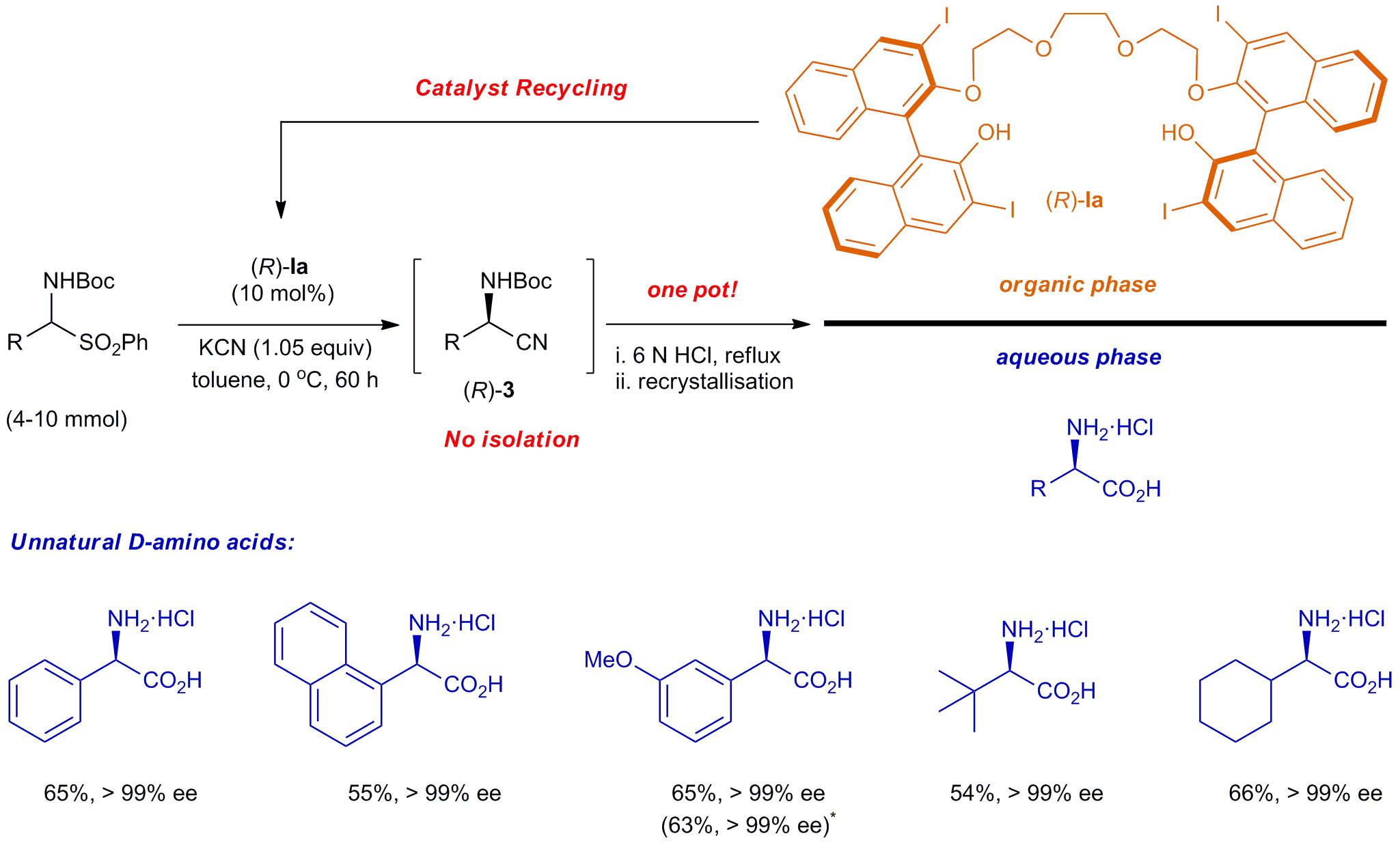
Catalytic asymmetric Strecker synthesis. The catalyst 1a is based on chiral 1,1′-Bi-2-naphthol (BINOL), the "R" indicating the chirality. "Boc" is tert-Butyloxycarbonyl protecting group.

Catalytic asymmetric Strecker reaction can be effected using thiourea-derived catalysts. In 2012, a BINOL-derived catalyst was employed to generate chiral cyanide anion (see figure).

== History ==
The German chemist Adolph Strecker discovered the series of chemical reactions that produce an amino acid from an aldehyde or ketone. Using ammonia or ammonium salts in this reaction gives unsubstituted amino acids. In the original Strecker reaction acetaldehyde, ammonia, and hydrogen cyanide combined to form after hydrolysis alanine. Using primary and secondary amines in place of ammonium was shown to yield N-substituted amino acids.

The classical Strecker synthesis gives racemic mixtures of α-amino acids as products, but several alternative procedures using asymmetric auxiliaries or asymmetric catalysts have been developed.

The asymmetric Strecker reaction was reported by Harada in 1963. The first reported asymmetric synthesis via a chiral catalyst was published in 1996. However, this was retracted in 2023.

== Commercial syntheses of amino acids ==
Several methods exist to synthesize amino acids aside from the Strecker synthesis.

The commercial production of amino acids, however, usually relies on mutant bacteria that overproduce individual amino acids using glucose as a carbon source. Otherwise amino acids are produced by enzymatic conversions of synthetic intermediates. 2-Aminothiazoline-4-carboxylic acid is an intermediate in one industrial synthesis of L-cysteine. Aspartic acid is produced by the addition of ammonia to fumarate using a lyase.

== See also ==
- Bucherer–Bergs reaction
