= Methional =

Names
- Preferred IUPAC name 3-(Methylsulfanyl)propanal
- Other names 3-(Methylmercapto)propionaldehyde; 3-(Methylthio)propionaldehyde; 3-(Methylthio)propanal; Methional; 4-Thiapentanal; β-(Methylthio)propionaldehyde

Identifiers
CAS Number	3268-49-3
3D model (JSmol)	Interactive image
ChEBI	CHEBI:49017
ChemSpider	17597
ECHA InfoCard	100.019.893
EC Number	221-882-5
PubChem CID	18635
UNII	0AAO8V0F1R
CompTox Dashboard (EPA)	DTXSID9027528
- InChI: InChI=1S/C4H8OS/c1-6-4-2-3-5/h3H,2,4H2,1H3 Key: CLUWOWRTHNNBBU-UHFFFAOYSA-N
- SMILES: CSCCC=O

Properties
Chemical formula	C_{4}H_{8}OS
Molar mass	104.17
Appearance	Colorless to pale yellow liquid
Odor	Cooked potato, meaty, onion-like
Density	1.04 g/mL (20 °C)
Melting point	−75 °C (−103 °F; 198 K)
Boiling point	165–166 °C (329–331 °F; 438–439 K)
Solubility in water	Moderately soluble in water (~75 g/L at 20 °C); readily soluble in ethanol, propylene glycol, and oils

Hazards
- GHS labelling
Pictograms	(GHS05: Corrosive) (GHS06: Toxic) (GHS07: Exclamation mark)
Signal word	Danger
Hazard statements	H227, H302, H311, H315, H317, H318, H332, H412
Precautionary statements	P233, P264, P280, P305+P354+P338, P308+P316, P321, P330, P361+P364, P405, P501
- Except where otherwise noted, data are given for materials in their standard state (at 25 °C [77 °F], 100 kPa). Infobox references

Methional is an organic compound with the formula CH_{3}SCH_{2}CH_{2}CHO. It is a colorless liquid with an odour described as "musty, potato, tomato, earthy, vegetable, creamy, oily" that is a degradation product of methionine. It is a notable flavor in potato-based snacks, namely potato chips, one of the most popular foods containing methional. Traces of the compound can also be found in black tea and green tea based products. Methional contains both aldehyde and thioether functional groups. It is readily soluble in alcohol solvents, including propylene glycol and dipropylene glycol.

== Occurrence ==
In nature, methional is a thermally-induced volatile flavor compound. For instance, the heat-initiated Maillard reaction of reducing sugars and amino acids forms the initial basis of methional's composition. The formation of methional stems from the interaction of α-dicarbonyl compounds (intermediate products in the Maillard reaction) with methionine (Met) by the Strecker degradation reaction:

CH_{3}SCH_{2}CH_{2}(NH_{2})CHCO_{2}H + O → CH_{3}SCH_{2}CH_{2}(HN=)CCO_{2}H + H_{2}O

CH_{3}SCH_{2}CH_{2}(HN=)CCO_{2}H + H_{2}O → CH_{3}SCH_{2}CH_{2}CHO + NH_{3} + CO_{2}

Methional easily degrades into methanethiol, which then oxidizes into dimethyl disulfide. Dimethyl disulfide is partly responsible for the "reactive sulfur" that contributes to the taste of potatoes. Furthermore, the methionine resulting from the Strecker degradation reaction produces alkyl pyrazines, which contribute to the flavors in roasted, toasted, or thermally processed foods. Due to the ease of its decomposition, a large portion of methional is lost during potato processing.

Similarly, in the presence of flavin mononucleotide (FMN) and light, methionine is nonenzymatically oxidized into methional, ammonia, and carbon dioxide.

CH_{3}SCH_{2}CH_{2}(NH_{2})CHCO_{2}H → CH_{3}SCH_{2}CH_{2}CHO + NH_{3} + CO_{2}

== Preparation and reactions ==
Methional is synthesized commercially by the reaction of methanethiol and acrolein.

CH_{3}SH + CH_{2}=CHCHO → CH_{3}SCH_{2}CH_{2}CHO

Using the Strecker synthesis, methional is converted to methionine. For the purpose of animal feed supplements, enantiopure methionine is not required.

Methional is a versatile reagent in organic chemistry.

=== Biological routes ===
Because of their high cost, methional or its precursor methionine are not added during potato processing. In order to intensify flavoring of heat-processed potato foods, biotechnological approaches are used to increase methionine levels, and thus methional levels, in potato foods.

The enzyme aminotransferase acts on methionine to remove the amine and form an α-keto-γ-methylthiobutyric acid. As catalyzed by α-keto acid decarboxylase, this ketomethylthiobutyric acid converts to methional.

CH_{3}S(CH_{2})_{2}CH(NH_{2})CO_{2}H + O → CH_{3}S(CH_{2})_{2}COCO_{2}H + NH_{3}
CH_{3}S(CH_{2})_{2}COCO_{2}H → CH_{3}S(CH_{2})_{2}CHO + CO_{2}
