= BCDMH =

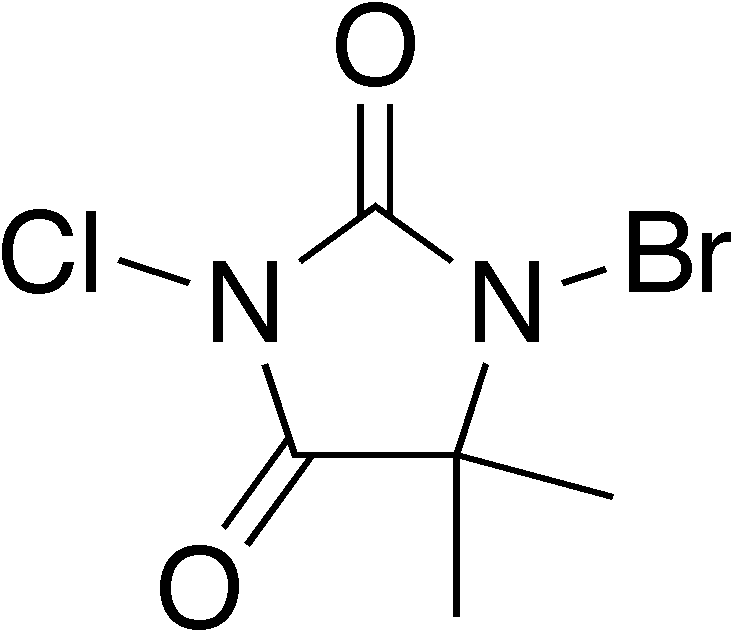

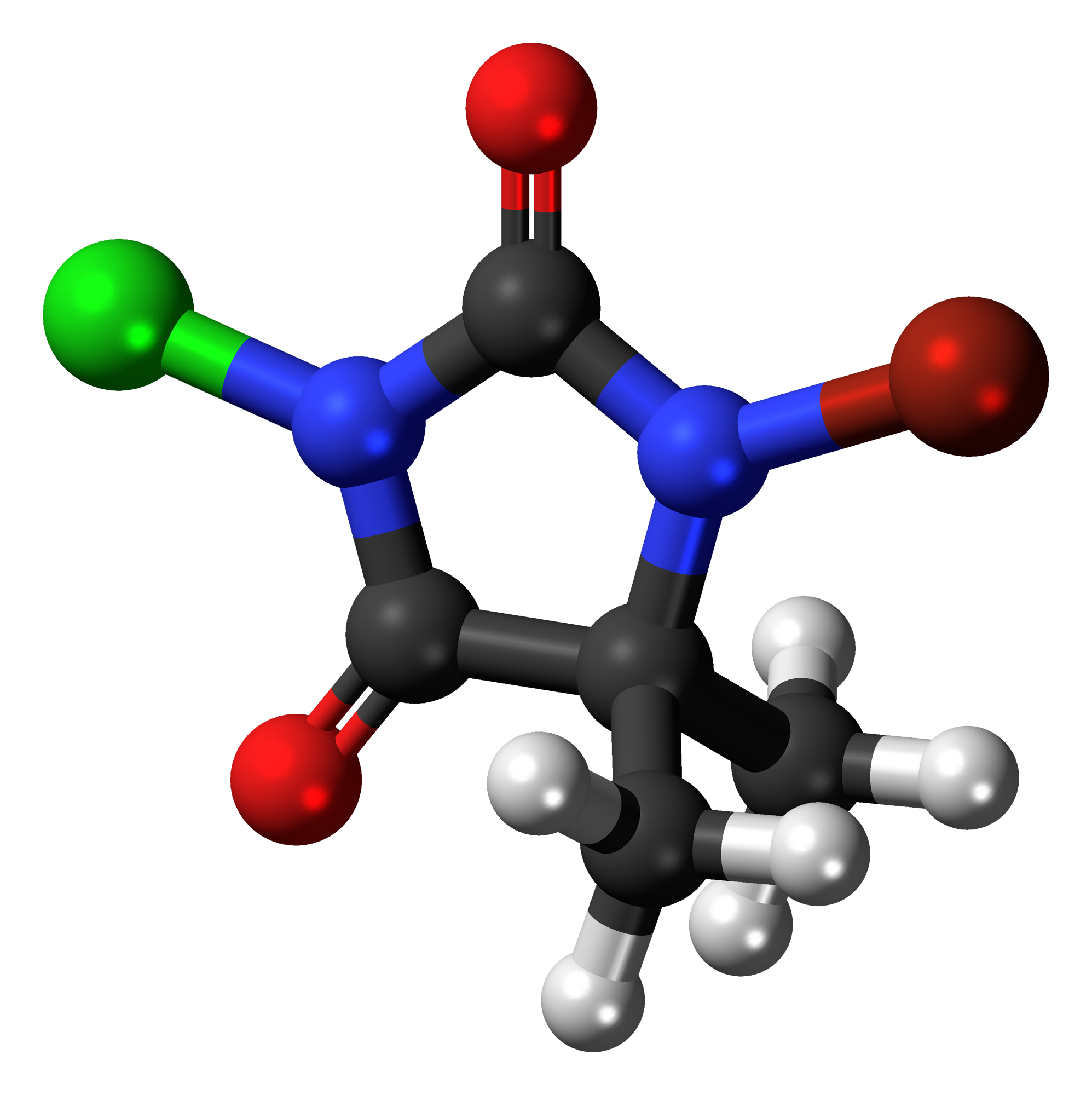

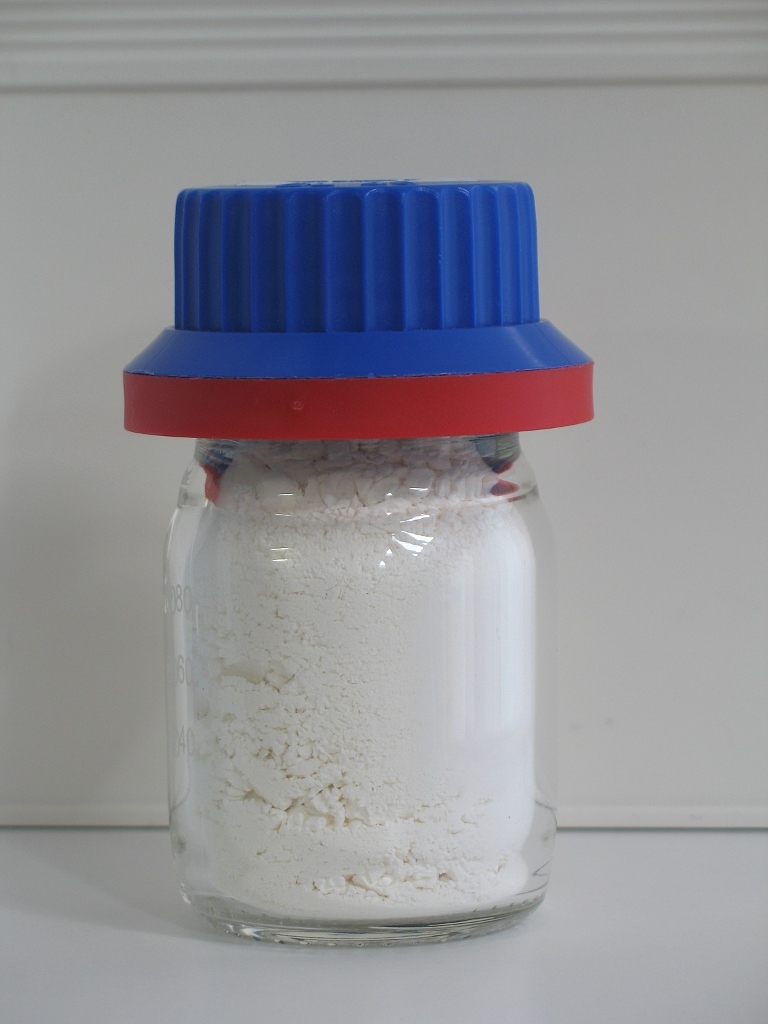

Names
- Preferred IUPAC name 1-Bromo-3-chloro-5,5-dimethylimidazolidine-2,4-dione
- Other names bromochloro-5,5-dimethylhydantoin, BCDMH, agribrom, aquabrom, aquabrome, bromicide, bromochlorodimethylhydantoin, di-halo, halogene T30, HarvestCide, nylate, photobrome, slimicide 78P

Identifiers
CAS Number	16079-88-2
3D model (JSmol)	Interactive image
ChEMBL	ChEMBL1895319
ChemSpider	29069
ECHA InfoCard	100.004.334
EC Number	204-766-9
PubChem CID	31335
UNII	W18O2G87ND
CompTox Dashboard (EPA)	DTXSID7029162
- InChI: InChI=1S/C5H6BrClN2O2/c1-5(2)3(10)8(6)4(11)9(5)7/h1-2H3 Key: PQRDTUFVDILINV-UHFFFAOYSA-N; InChI=1/C5H6BrClN2O2/c1-5(2)3(10)8(6)4(11)9(5)7/h1-2H3 Key: PQRDTUFVDILINV-UHFFFAOYAT
- SMILES: O=C1N(Br)C(=O)N(Cl)C1(C)C

Properties
Chemical formula	C_{5}H_{6}BrClN_{2}O_{2}
Molar mass	241.47 g/mol
Appearance	White solid
Density	1.9 g/cm^{3}
Melting point	159 to 163 °C (318 to 325 °F; 432 to 436 K)
Solubility in water	0.15 g/100 ml (25 °C)

Hazards
- Occupational safety and health (OHS/OSH)
Main hazards	Flamability, Inhalation
- GHS labelling
Pictograms	(GHS03: Oxidizing) (GHS05: Corrosive) (GHS07: Exclamation mark) (GHS09: Environmental hazard)
Signal word	Danger
Hazard statements	H272, H302, H312, H314, H317, H332, H400
Precautionary statements	P210, P220, P221, P260, P264, P270, P271, P272, P273, P280, P301+P312, P301+P330+P331, P302+P352, P303+P361+P353, P304+P312, P304+P340, P305+P351+P338, P310, P312, P321, P322, P330, P333+P313, P363, P370+P378, P391, P405, P501
NFPA 704 (fire diamond)	3 1 1
Flash point	Decomposes at 160°C
Safety data sheet (SDS)	External MSDS
- Except where otherwise noted, data are given for materials in their standard state (at 25 °C [77 °F], 100 kPa). verify (what is ?) Infobox references

1-Bromo-3-chloro-5,5-dimethylhydantoin (BCDMH or bromochlorodimethylhydantoin) is a chemical structurally related to hydantoin. It is a white crystalline compound with a slight bromine and acetone odor and is sparingly soluble in water, but soluble in acetone.

BCDMH is an excellent source of both chlorine and bromine as it reacts slowly with water releasing hypochlorous acid and hypobromous acid. It used as a chemical disinfectant for recreational water sanitation and drinking water purification. BCDMH works in the following manner:

The initial BCDMH reacts with water (R = Dimethylhydantoin):

BrClR + 2 H_{2}O → HOBr + HOCl + RH_{2}

Hypobromous acid partially dissociates in water:

HOBr → H^{+} + OBr^{−}

Hypobromous acid oxidizes the substrate, itself being reduced to bromide:

HOBr + Live pathogens → Br^{−} + Dead pathogens

The bromide ions are oxidized with the hypochlorous acid that was formed from the initial BCDMH:

Br^{−} + HOCl → HOBr + Cl^{−}

This produces more hypobromous acid; the hypochlorous acid itself act directly as a disinfectant in the process.

== Preparation ==
This compound is prepared by first brominating, then chlorinating 5,5-dimethylhydantoin:

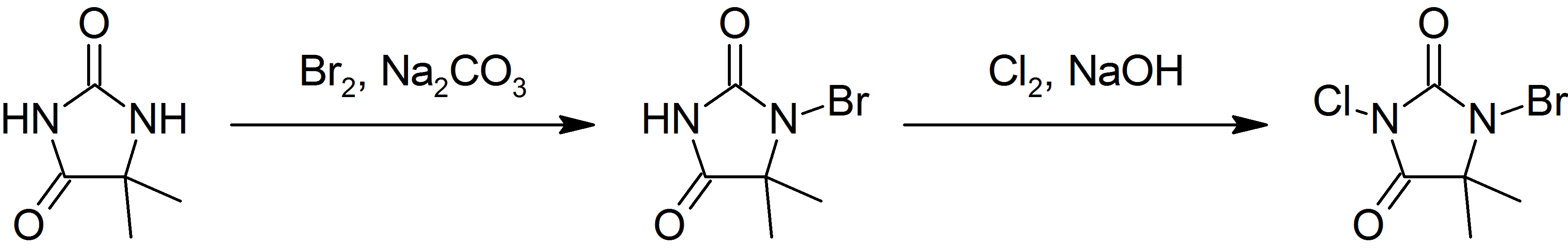
