= Transition metal catalytic asymmetric dearomatization reactions =

Category of organic chemical reactions

Catalyzed asymmetric dearomatization reactions (CADA reactions) are a category of asymmetric dearomatization reactions that catalytically transform aromatic compounds into enantioenriched polycycles and heterocyclic skeletons. The term was coined in 2012 by You et al.

== History ==
In 2001, the field of asymmetric catalysis was pioneered with Nobel Prize winners Knowles, Noyori, and Sharpless for work in catalytic asymmetric hydrogenation and oxidation. More recently, many groups have begun applying transition metal (TM) catalysis to such processes with great success in enantiopurity of important biological molecules. The first TM CADA reactions used palladium catalysis, but methods evolved to include catalytic iridium and ruthenium for different applications.

The first report of selective C-3 allylation of indoles under Pd(PPh_{3})_{4} catalysis was from Tamaru et al. in 2005. Shortly after in 2006, Trost, Quancard, et al. investigated catalytic enantioselective version (of dearomative allylation of indoles) with Pd_{2}(dba)_{3}CH_{3}Cl with success.

In April 2008, You et al. investigated a Friedel-Crafts type allylic alkylation (allylic substitution, intermolecular) of indoles, with [Ir(cod)Cl]_{2} as a catalyst. This led to intramolecular allylic alkylation. Shortly after, in 2009 Buchwald et al. explored a similarly intramolecular enantioselective Pd-catalyzed dearomatization of naphthalene derivatives. This led to the Pd-catalyzed arylative dearomatization of phenols to yield spirocyclohexadienone products with excellent yield.

In August 2010, the You group then did intramolecular asymmetric dearomatization of indoles using Ir-catalyzed allylic alkylation, leading to the development of intramolecular asymmetric allylic dearomatization of phenols. The allylic alkylation of pyrroles was more challenging than the same allylic alkylation of indoles in terms of enantioselectivity and regioselectivity. However, this allylic dearomatization of pyrroles nonetheless yielded bicyclic spiro-2H-pyrroles with good yield, enantioselectivity, and diastereoselectivity.

The same year, Hamada et al. explored an intramolecular dearomatization of phenols with Pd-catalyzed allylic alkylation, which gave spirocyclohexadienones in good yield, relating to diastereoselectivity. This was later applied by the same group to enantioselective dearomatization of naphthol derivatives.

Other advances include in 2011 when You et al. found that the Ir-catalyzed allylic dearomatization applied to pyrroles., and later in 2016 when Wang et al. investigated Mg-driven napthols, discovered new hydride transfer pathway.

== Mechanism ==
Dearomatization reactions are useful in pharmaceutical/industry applications; however, historically, creating a purely enantioselective process was rare. Most enantioselective chemical processes require harsh reaction conditions to break the stability given through aromaticity. The You group once performed a synthesis of aza-spiroindolenines using a ruthenium catalyst, starting at room temperature, over a 72-hour period, resulting in an undetermined percent yield and diastereomeric ratio from partial decomposition. They then improved this synthesis over time, tuning the solvents and base to get better enantiopurity and percent yields.

You et al., decided to compile a lengthy list of dearomatization reactions to pull the best features from each mechanism to create the CADA reactions. Below is one in which a phenol reacts with a Michael acceptor in order to initiate a 'cascading effect' of electron movement to create an adamantane-like core.

Original inspiration for the CADA reactions to dearomatize and create quaternary carbons.

Prior to coining CADA, there was an asymmetric acylation and alkylation reaction involving palladium. This cycle (shown below) allows for enantioselection at every step other than the removal of the final product(s).

Catalytic Cycle for Catalytic Allylic Alkylation starting with an E-configured alkene.

While indole and pyrrole are most commonly used in CADA reactions, acting nucleophiles for the intra- or intermolecular reactions include phenol, β-naphthol, pyridine, or pyrazine. The Wang group discovered a tandem cyclization reaction, showing that a hydride ion can lead to formation of a polycyclic product via intramolecular dearomatization.

Intramolecular Hydride Transfer

With all of these previously found mechanisms combined, CADA found a way to dearomatize and form rings with high enantiopurity through the use of transition metals like Pd, Ru, and Ir. This mechanism was a hot topic from 2013 - 2018 but slightly fizzled out while other reactions took the spotlight. Although they seem to be making a comeback, as the most recent example of a catalytic dearomatization reaction was performed by Zhang et al., where the group sought to use a chiral N-Heterocyclic Carbene (NHC) to form a new ring from a saturated ester. In May 2024, they were able to achieve high enantiopurity (greater than 99% ee and 91% de) without the use of harsh chemicals or a chemically harsh environment.

NHC-catalyzed CADA reaction.

== Ruthenium (vs. Iridium) catalysis ==
Two families of allylic Ru (IV) complexes were investigated for application in the Friedel-Crafts type allylic alkylation (previously performed with [Ir(cod)Cl]_{2} ) much better results. The Ru complex had a much broader substrate scope and was a cheaper, easier-to-synthesize catalyst, under much milder conditions than the previous Ir reactions. This success is hypothesized due to the variety of ligands the Ru center accepts, the range of oxidation states, tolerance to many substrates and conditions, as well as general use in the allylation of nucleophiles.

[Cp*Ru(NCCH_{3})_{3}]PF_{6}Ruthenium catalyst for Indole Synthesis

[Cp*Ru(NCCH_{3})_{3}]PF_{6} yielded good regioselectivity and chirality transfer, which uncovered a new route for the synthesis of antidepressants fluoxetine and ephedrine. Due to the wide range of possible oxidation states of Ru, neutral Ru complexes such as [CpRuCl(cod)] have been investigated as well to activate allylic carbonates; however these often require more harsh reaction conditions. Ru (IV) complexes performed better than Ru(II) with almost a full conversion rate, and were tolerant of water in the reaction. Optimal reaction conditions for the Ru(IV) complex were determined to be using K_{3}PO_{4} as a base and CH_{3}CN as a solvent.

Similarly to the Pd-catalyzed precursors, the Ru-catalyzed reaction proceeds via π-allyl complex and stereoselectivity is due to a double inversion mechanism. However, the Ru-catalyzed reactions result in a complete chirality transfer upon the use of optically pure (single enantiomer) substrates. Mechanistic studies indicate that this process forms π-allyl intermediates, but the Ru−π-allyl complexes do not π−σ−π isomerize like the Pd complexes.

== Transition states and orbital interactions ==
The difficulty in breaking aromaticity lies in the thermodynamic stability granted to aromatic compounds from their delocalized π bonds. Therefore, computational and mechanistic studies of dearomatization reactions are important in understanding the reactions, improving efficiency, and expanding applicatinons.

Asymmetric allylic alkylations are unique in that the net reaction occurs at sp^{3} centers, leading to their ability to transform achiral or racemic material into enantiopure product (unlike most metal-catalyzed enantioselective processes). DFT calculations have supported a hypothesis of a "three-center two-electron" type transition state. The three-center two-electron bond indicates three atoms sharing two electrons, a strong intramolecular covalent and electron-deficient bond. This indicates that allylic migration occurs in a concerted step through the three-center two-electron transition state, and is the reason for the high degree of stereoselectivity in these reaction types. Due to the concerted nature of the migratory step, a free carbocation cannot be formed during migration/rearrangement at the allylic position, resulting in no racemization and no loss of enantioselectivity. This hypothesis is supported by similar dearomatization reactions related to C-H bond activation and enantioselectivity. A DFT study by the You group in 2021 looked at Rh(III) catalyzed dearomatization reactions of napthols with C-H bond activation as the initiating step. This study found that the reaction was determined through the migratory insertion of the alkyne; however in contrast, the final product is obtained via reductive elimination from an acyclic intermediate . The group also posited that (similar to discussion in previous sections about π-allyl intermediates and isomerization) the π-π interaction between alkyne substituents and naphthol may contribute to regioselectivity with use of asymmetrical alkynes. In studies that investigated Pd-catalyzed reactions, it similarly was determined that the mechanism follows the formation of an intermediate which is responsible for the formation of the dearomatic product via reductive elimination.

The transition states in these reactions differ drastically depending on the catalyst, substrates, and precursors; therefore, a definitive explanation for the all-around enantioselectivity of these processes proves difficult.

== Applications ==
CADA reactions are useful in synthesizing biologically active compounds, natural products, and medicinal compounds, as they can achieve enantioselective products. These reactions frequently involve a precursor of indole due to the biological importance of specifically functionalized and enantiospecific indole derivatives. While many natural products contain aromatic rings, they also include heterocycles, which can be aromatic or nonaromatic. There is also a need to create bridged quaternary carbons to mimic essential oil constituents like camphor, commonly seen in essential oils of sage.

Currently, the Pictet-Spingler reaction is the most common route for functionalization of indoles for pharmaceuticals. The regioselective allylic alkylation of indoles can provide a synthesis for auxins (plant growth-promoting acidic materials) and potent synthetic HIV inhibitors.
