= DBDMH =

1,3-Dibromo-5,5-dimethylhydantoin
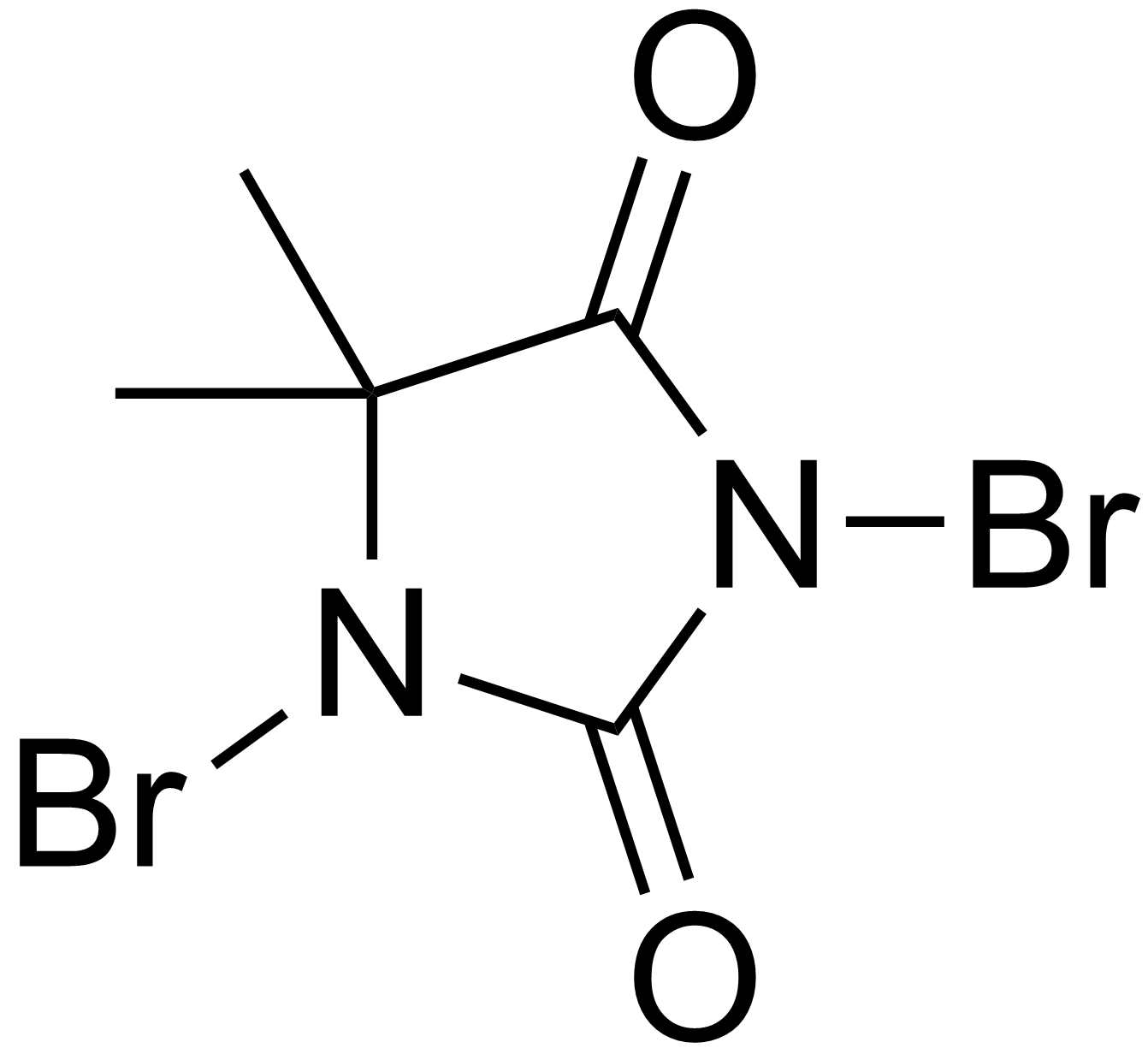

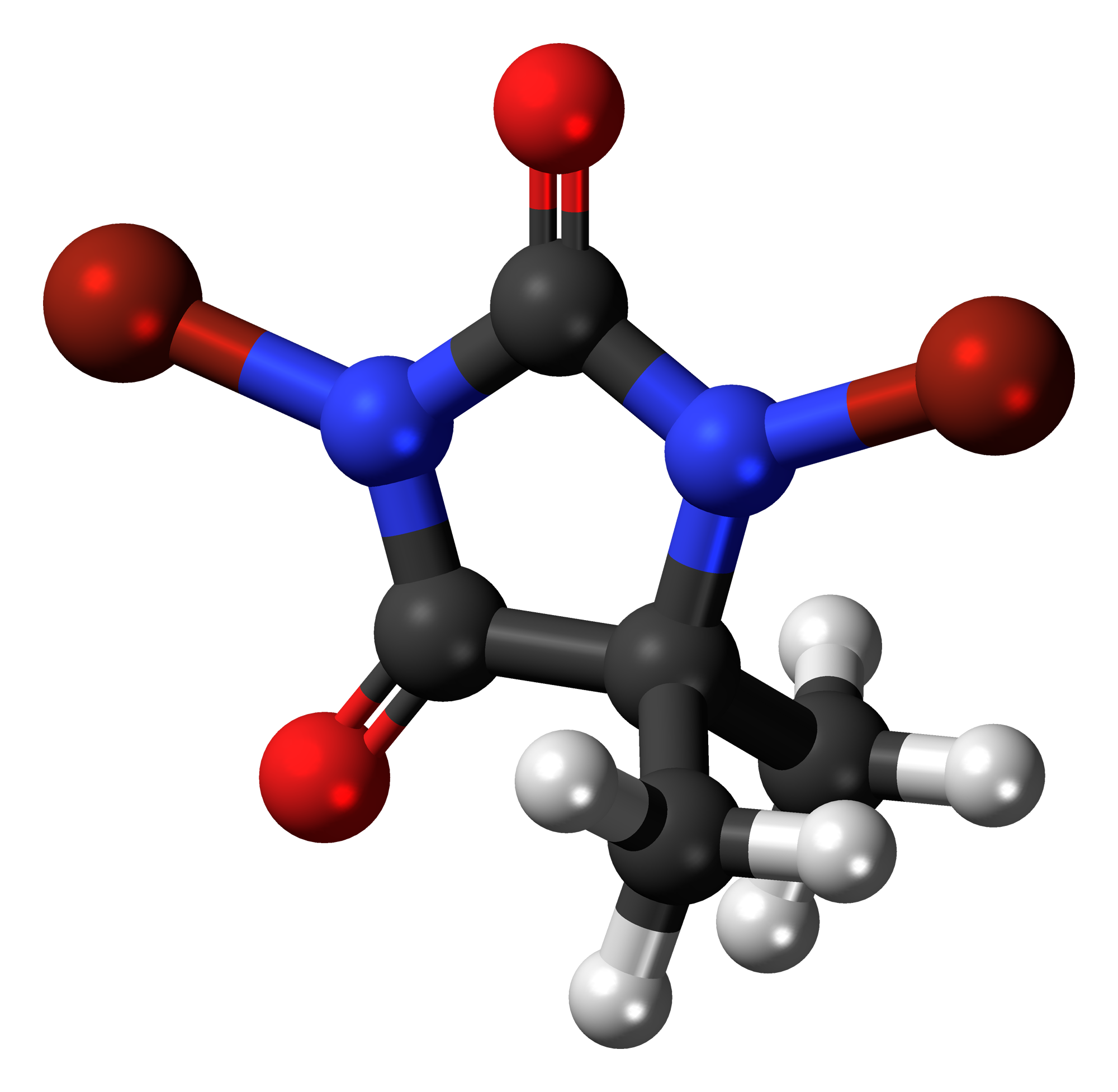

Names
- Preferred IUPAC name 1,3-Dibromo-5,5-dimethylimidazolidine-2,4-dione
- Other names DBDMH, Dibromantin, Dibromodimethylhydantoin

Identifiers
CAS Number	77-48-5
3D model (JSmol)	Interactive image
ChEMBL	ChEMBL3184055
ChemSpider	6234
ECHA InfoCard	100.000.938
EC Number	201-030-9
PubChem CID	6479
UNII	V9R5F9I7MZ
CompTox Dashboard (EPA)	DTXSID3035341
- InChI: InChI=1S/C5H6Br2N2O2/c1-5(2)3(10)8(6)4(11)9(5)7/h1-2H3 Key: VRLDVERQJMEPIF-UHFFFAOYSA-N; InChI=1/C5H6Br2N2O2/c1-5(2)3(10)8(6)4(11)9(5)7/h1-2H3 Key: VRLDVERQJMEPIF-UHFFFAOYAQ
- SMILES: O=C1N(Br)C(=O)N(Br)C1(C)C

Properties
Chemical formula	C_{5}H_{6}Br_{2}N_{2}O_{2}
Molar mass	285.923 g·mol^{−1}
Appearance	White solid
Density	1.36 g/cm^{3}
Melting point	197 to 203 °C (387 to 397 °F; 470 to 476 K)
Solubility in water	0.1 g/100 mL (20 °C)

Hazards
- GHS labelling
Pictograms	(GHS05: Corrosive) (GHS06: Toxic) (GHS07: Exclamation mark) (GHS09: Environmental hazard)
Signal word	Danger
Hazard statements	H301, H302, H314, H317, H319, H410
Precautionary statements	P260, P264, P270, P272, P273, P280, P301+P310, P301+P312, P301+P330+P331, P302+P352, P303+P361+P353, P304+P340, P305+P351+P338, P310, P321, P330, P333+P313, P337+P313, P363, P391, P405, P501
- Except where otherwise noted, data are given for materials in their standard state (at 25 °C [77 °F], 100 kPa). verify (what is ?) Infobox references

DBDMH (an abbreviation for 1,3-dibromo-5,5-dimethylhydantoin) is an organic compound derived from the heterocycle called dimethylhydantoin. This white crystalline compound with a slight bromine odor is widely used as a disinfectant used for drinking water purification, recreational water treatment, as a bleaching agent in pulp and paper mills, and for treating industrial/commercial water cooling systems. Its action does not involve the formation of hypochlorous acid and instead involves hypobromous acid.

== Mechanism of action ==
1,3-Dibromo-5,5-dimethylhydantoin is a source of bromine, which is equivalent to hypobromous acid (HOBr).

Br_{2}X + 2 H_{2}O → 2 HOBr + H_{2}X

(Where H_{2}X is 5,5-dimethylhydantoin)

With a pK_{a} of 8.6, hypobromous acid partially dissociates in water:

HOBr ⇌ H^{+} + BrO^{−}

Hypobromous acid serves as a source of "Br^{+}," which produces bromide ions in the process of disinfection:

HOBr + live pathogens → Br^{−} + dead pathogens

The resulting bromide ions can then undergo oxidation to hypobromous acid in the presence of an oxidizer of sufficient strength e.g. ozone, hypochlorous acid, potassium monopersulfate. This reoxidation process is commonly called "activation" of the bromide ion:

Br^{−} + HOCl → HOBr + Cl^{−}
