= Borsche–Drechsel cyclization =

Chemical reaction

Named after	Walter Borsche; Edmund Drechsel
Reaction type	Ring forming reaction

Identifiers
RSC ontology ID	RXNO:0000532

The Borsche–Drechsel cyclization is a chemical reaction used to synthesize tetrahydrocarbazoles by the acid-catalyzed cyclization of cyclohexanone arylhydrazones. The reaction was first described by Edmund Drechsel in 1888 and by Walther Borsche in 1908.

Borsche–Drechsel cyclization

Borsche–Drechsel cyclization is the central step in Borsche–Drechsel carbazole synthesis, where in the first step phenylhydrazine is condensed with cyclohexanone to form the cyclohexanone phenylhydrazone, and in the final step the resulting tetrahydrocarbazole is oxidized to carbazole itself.

== Mechanism ==
The reaction has been described in the literature as proceeding in a manner similar to the Fischer indole synthesis.

Here, the acid-catalyzed proton transfer first converts the cyclohexanone phenylhydrazone 1 to the intermediate 2. Subsequently, a heat-induced sigmatropic reaction occurs to produce 3, which is protonated and cyclizes into 4. Elimination of ammonia then leads to the final product, the tetrahydrocarbazole 5.

== See also ==
- Bucherer carbazole synthesis
- Fischer indole synthesis
