= Aminonaphthalenesulfonic acids =

Aminonaphthalenesulfonic acids are compounds with the composition C_{10}H_{6}(NH_{2})(SO_{3}H), being derived from naphthalene (C_{10}H_{8}) substituted by an amino and sulfonic acid groups. These compounds are colorless solids. They are useful precursors to dyes.

1-Aminonaphthalenesulfonic acids
| Isomer | CAS Registry Number | Alternative names | Preparative route, notes |
|---|---|---|---|
| 1-Aminonaphthalene-2-sulfonic acid | 81-06-1 | ortho-naphthionic acid | heating sodium naphthionate induces net migration of sulfonate to 2-position |
| 1-Aminonaphthalene-4-sulfonic acid | 84-86-6 | Piria’s acid, naphthionic acid | sulfonation of 1-aminonaphthalene, precursor to acid red 25, C.I. food red 3, C.I. food red 7, C.I. food red 9, and C.I. |
| 1-Aminonaphthalene-5-sulfonic acid | 84-89-9 | Laurent’s acid, L acid, Purpurin acid | reduction of 1-nitronaphthalene-5-sulfonic acid. With NaOH, converts to 5-amino-1-naphthol ("purpurol"). |
| 1-Aminonaphthalene-6-sulfonic acid | 119-79-9 | 1,6-Cleve’s acid (named after swedish chemist Per Teodor Cleve) | sulfonation of 1-aminonaphthalene |
| 1-Aminonaphthalene-7-sulfonic acid | 119-28-8 | 1,7-Cleve’s acid | by-product in production of 1,6-Cleve’s acid, precursor to C.I. Acid Black 36 |
| 1-Aminonaphthalene-8-sulfonic acid | 82-75-7 | Peri acid | reduction of 1-nitronaphthalene-8-sulfonic acid, precursor to C.I. Acid Blue 113 |
| 1-Aminonaphthalene-2-hydroxy-4-sulfonic acid | 116-63-2 | - | from nitroso-β-naphthol |

Notes: Peri-acid dehydrates to the sultam. Via the Bucherer reaction, heating periacid with anilinium salts gives the N-phenyl derivative, precursor to Acid Blue 113.

2-Aminonaphthalenesulfonic acids
| Isomer | CAS Registry Number | Alternative names | Preparative route and notes |
|---|---|---|---|
| 2-Aminonaphthalene-1-sulfonic acid | 81-16-3 | Tobias acid | Bucherer reaction of 2-hydroxynaphthalene-1-sulfonic acid with ammonium salts, precursor to C.I. Pigment Red 49 |
| 2-Aminonaphthalene-5-sulfonic acid | 81-05-0 | Dahl’s acid, Dressel acid, D acid | Desulfonation of 2-aminonaphthalene-1,5-disulfonic acid |
| 2-Aminonaphthalene-6-sulfonic acid | 93-00-5 | Bronner acid | Bucherer amination of 2-hydroxynaphthalene-6-sulfonic acid |
| 2-Aminonaphthalene-7-sulfonic acid | 494-44-0 | Amido F acid; Delta acid; Monosulphonic F acid | Bucherer amination of 2-hydroxynaphthalene-7-sulfonic acid |
| 2-Aminonaphthalene-8-sulfonic acid | 86-60-2 | Badische acid | Bucherer amination of 2-hydroxynaphthalene-8-sulfonic acid |

== Structure ==
These compounds feature amines and sulfonic acid groups. According to X-ray crystallography, some members of this series, however exist as zwitterions, i.e. C_{10}H_{6}(NH^{+}_{3})(SO^{−}_{3}).

== Related compounds ==
- Hydroxynaphthalenesulfonic acid
