= Naphthionic acid =

Names
- Preferred IUPAC name 4-Aminonaphthalene-1-sulfonic acid
- Other names Piria's acid

Identifiers
CAS Number	84-86-6
3D model (JSmol)	Interactive image
ChEBI	CHEBI:38219
ChemSpider	6532
ECHA InfoCard	100.001.425
EC Number	201-567-9
PubChem CID	6790
UNII	8ZIK65C5CD
CompTox Dashboard (EPA)	DTXSID3058909
- InChI: InChI=1S/C10H9NO3S/c11-9-5-6-10(15(12,13)14)8-4-2-1-3-7(8)9/h1-6H,11H2,(H,12,13,14) Key: NRZRRZAVMCAKEP-UHFFFAOYSA-N; InChI=1/C10H9NO3S/c11-9-5-6-10(15(12,13)14)8-4-2-1-3-7(8)9/h1-6H,11H2,(H,12,13,14) Key: NRZRRZAVMCAKEP-UHFFFAOYAN
- SMILES: c1ccc2c(c1)c(ccc2S(=O)(=O)O)N

Properties
Chemical formula	C_{10}H_{9}NO_{3}S
Molar mass	223.24
Appearance	white solid
Density	1.6703 g/cm^{3}
- Except where otherwise noted, data are given for materials in their standard state (at 25 °C [77 °F], 100 kPa). Infobox references

Naphthionic acid is an organic compound with the formula C_{10}H_{6}(NH_{2})(SO_{3}H). It is one of several aminonaphthalenesulfonic acids, which are derivatives of naphthalene containing both amine and sulfonic acid functional groups. Naphthionic acid is a white solid, although commercial samples can appear gray. Deprotonation of naphthionic acid gives the sulfonate C_{10}H_{6}(NH_{2})(SO_{3})^{−}, which is call naphthionate.

== Production and reactions ==
Naphthionic acid is prepared by treating 1-aminonaphthalene with sulfuric acid.

Naphthionic acid is used in the synthesis of azo dyes such as Rocceline (also known as Solid Red A). For this conversion sodium naphthionate is diazotated. The resulting diazonium derivative is coupled with β-naphthol.

Heating a solution of sodium naphtionate induces its conversion to 1-aminonaphthalene-2-sulfonate.
