= Dearomatization reaction =

Chemical reaction

A dearomatization reaction is an organic reaction in which the reactants are arenes and the products permanently lose their aromaticity. It is of some importance in synthetic organic chemistry for the organic synthesis of new building blocks and in total synthesis. Types of carbocyclic arene dearomization include hydrogenative (Birch reduction), alkylative, photochemical, thermal, oxidative, transition metal-assisted and enzymatic.

== Photochemical ==
Examples of photochemical reactions are those between certain arenes and alkenes forming [2+2] and [2+4] cycloaddition adducts.

== Enzymatic ==
Examples of enzymes capable of arene dearomatization are toluene dixoyhydrogenase, naphthalene dixoyhydrogenase and benzoyl CoA reductase.

== Transition metal-assisted ==
A classic example of transition metal-assisted dearomatization is the Buchner ring expansion. Catalytic asymmetric dearomatization reactions (CADA) are used in enantioselective synthesis.
