= Strecker degradation =

Chemical reaction

The Strecker degradation is a chemical reaction which converts an α-amino acid into an aldehyde containing the side chain, by way of an imine intermediate. It is named after Adolph Strecker, a German chemist.

The original observation by Strecker involved the use of alloxan as the oxidant in the first step, followed by hydrolysis:

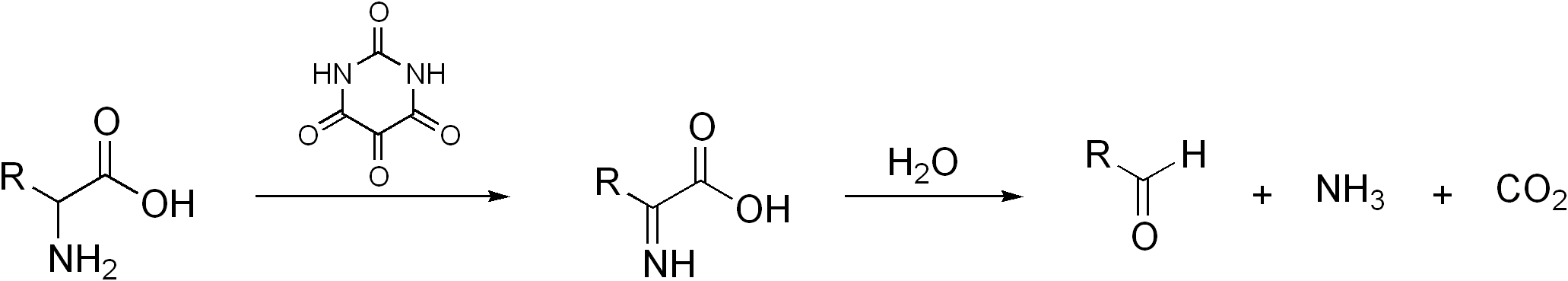

The reaction can take place using a variety of organic and inorganic reagents.
