= Urech hydantoin synthesis =

Chemical reaction

Named after	Friedrich Urech
Reaction type	Ring forming reaction

The Urech hydantoin synthesis is the chemical reaction of amino acids with potassium cyanate and hydrochloric acid to give hydantoins.

The Urech hydantoin synthesis

== Reaction mechanism ==
Urech Hydantoin synthesis

== See also ==
- Bucherer–Bergs reaction
