= Bäumler =

Bäumler or Baeumler [ˈbɔʏmlɐ] (Americanized as Baumler) is a German surname. Notable people with the surname include:

- Albert Baumler (1914–1973), American fighter ace
- Alfred Baeumler (1887–1968), German philosopher
- Andreas J. Bäumler, German-born microbiologist and immunologist
- Bryan Baeumler (born 1974), Canadian builder and renovator, and TV personality; owner of Baeumler Quality Construction and Renovation
- Carter Baumler (born 2002), American baseball player
- Christian Bäumler (1836–1933), German physician
- Ellen Baumler (1949–2023), American historian
- Erich Bäumler (1930–2003), German footballer
- Hans-Jürgen Bäumler (born 1942), German figure skater, actor, pop singer and television host
- Jean-Pierre Baeumler (1948–2021), French politician
- Nicole Bäumler (born 1986), German politician

== See also ==
- The dictionary definition of baumeln at Wiktionary
- Brad Boimler, fictional character of the television series Star Trek: Lower Decks
- Baumer
- Bäumer
