= Jachmann =

Jachmann is a German surname.

The forename Jach is of Hebrew descent and stems from Yohanan יוֹחָנָן (Yôḥānān), a shortened form of יְהוֹחָנָן (Yəhôḥānān), with the meaning "YHWH is gracious".

In its Silesian mode, the name Jach can be traced to the Bohemian and Moravian variants of the Czech shorthand form Jach(a) of the given name Johannes. It was first mentioned 1377 in Prague as Johannes alias Jacha.

In its Polish mode, the name was first mentioned in the 14th century: 1326 Iach molendinator, 1437 Johannem dictum Jach, 1440 Iaskone alias Iach and 1452 Iach de Vilczouicze.

According to this, the surname Jachmann and the similar Jochmann can be seen as patronymic names.

== Variants ==
- Jach
- Jache
- Jachan
- Joch
- Jochmann

== People ==
=== Jachmann ===
- Alfred Jachmann (1829–1918), German public officer and banker
- Eduard von Jachmann (1822-1887), the first vice admiral of the Prussian Navy
- Johanna Jachmann-Wagner (1828-1894), mezzo-soprano singer, tragédienne, and teacher of singing and theatrical performance
- Reinhold Bernhard Jachmann (1767-1843), German theologian and educator

=== Jochmann ===
- Georg Jochmann (1874-1915), German internist and bacteriologist
- Hansi Jochmann (born 1953), German actress
- Jakob Jochmann (born 1993), Austrian handball player
- Rosa Jochmann (1901-1994), Austrian resistance activist and Ravensbrück survivor and later politician
- Werner Jochmann (1921-1994), German historian and director of the Research Centre for the History of National Socialism

=== Jachtmann ===
- Jan-Peter Jachtmann, German semi-professional poker player and editor-in-chief
