= Jaschek =

Jaschek is a German language surname of Slavic origin (cf. Jašek) derived from a pet form of the personal name Jach, or directly from Jan. Notable people with the name include:

- Carlos Jaschek (1926–1999), German-born Argentine astrophysicist
- Willi Jaschek (born 1940), German gymnast
