= Édouard Muller =

Édouard Muller may refer to:

- Édouard Muller (painter) (1823–1876), French painter
- Édouard Muller (businessman) (1885–1948), Swiss-French businessman
- Édouard Muller (cyclist) (1919–1997), French cyclist

== See also ==
- Eduard Müller (disambiguation)
