= Hinsberg oxindole synthesis =

The Hinsberg oxindole synthesis is a method of preparing oxindoles from the bisulfite additions of glyoxal. It is named after its inventor Oscar Hinsberg.

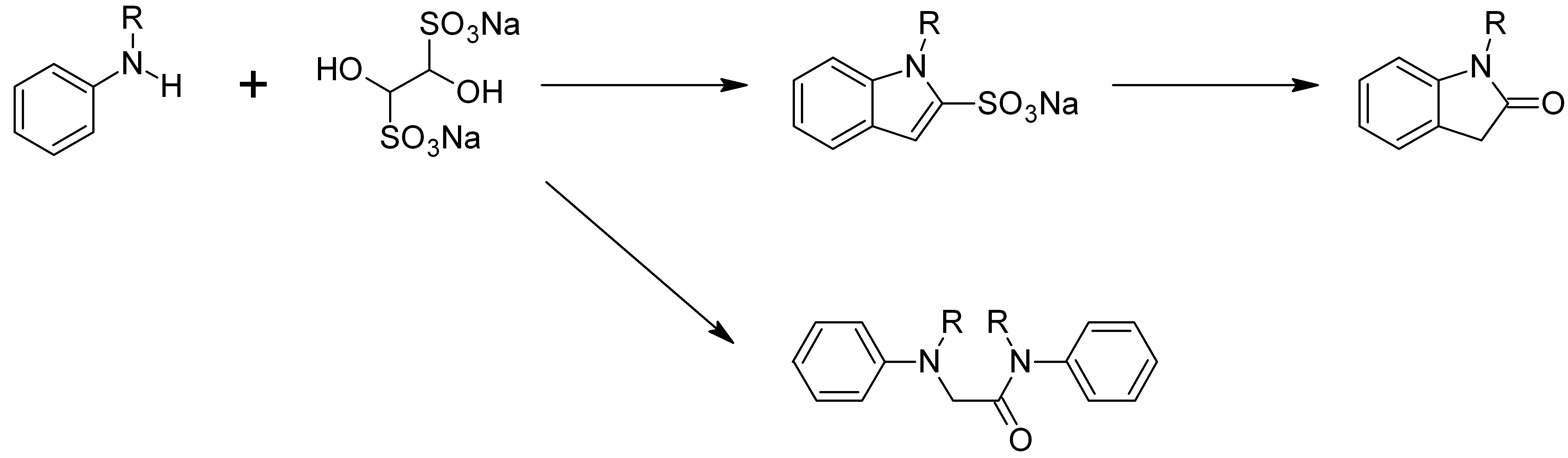

== See also ==
- Friedel-Crafts alkylation
- Stolle synthesis
- Hinsberg reaction
