= Baumert =

Baumert is a surname. Notable people with the surname include:

- Andrea Baumert (born 1967), German high jumper
- Jean Baumert (1902–1968), French sport wrestler

== See also ==
- Baumer
