= Theodor Rumpel =

Theodor Rumpel may refer to:

- Theodor Rumpel (surgeon) (1862–1923), German surgeon
- Theodor Rumpel (aviator) (1897–?), German World War I flying ace
