= Jochmann =

Jochmann is a German surname. Notable people with the surname include:

- Georg Jochmann (1874–1915), German internist and bacteriologist
- Hansi Jochmann (born 1953), German actress
- Jakob Jochmann (born 1993), Austrian handball player
- Werner Jochmann (1921–1994), German historian
