= Eduard Müller =

Eduard Müller may refer to:

- Eduard Müller (philologist) (1804–1875), German gymnasium director
- Eduard Müller (German politician) (1818–1895), German priest, member of the German Reichstag, co-founder of the German Catholic Centre Party
- Eduard Müller (sculptor) (1828–1895), German sculptor
- Eduard Müller (Swiss politician) (1848–1919), member of the Federal Council, President of the Confederation
- Eduard Müller (internist) (1876–1928), German internist and neurologist
- Eduard Müller (martyr) (1911–1943), German Catholic priest and anti-Nazi Lübeck martyr
- Eduard Müller (cross-country skier) (1912–1969), Swiss Olympic skier
- Eduard Müller (Austrian politician) (born 1962), Minister of Finance

== See also ==
- Édouard Muller (disambiguation)
