= Bäumer =

Bäumer is a German surname. Notable people with the surname include:

- Angelica Bäumer (1932–2025), Austrian art critic and art historian
- Bettina Bäumer (born 1940), Austrian-born Indian scholar of religion
- Gertrud Bäumer (1873–1954), German lawyer and politician
- Jens Bäumer (born 1978), German footballer
- Ludwig Bäumer (1888–1928), German writer and Communist activist
- Marie Bäumer (born 1969), German actress
- Paul Bäumer (1896–1927), German pilot

== See also ==
- Baumer
- Bäumler
