= Stollé synthesis =

Reactions in organic chemistry

The Stollé synthesis is a series of chemical reactions that produce oxindoles from anilines and α-haloacid chlorides (or oxalyl chloride).

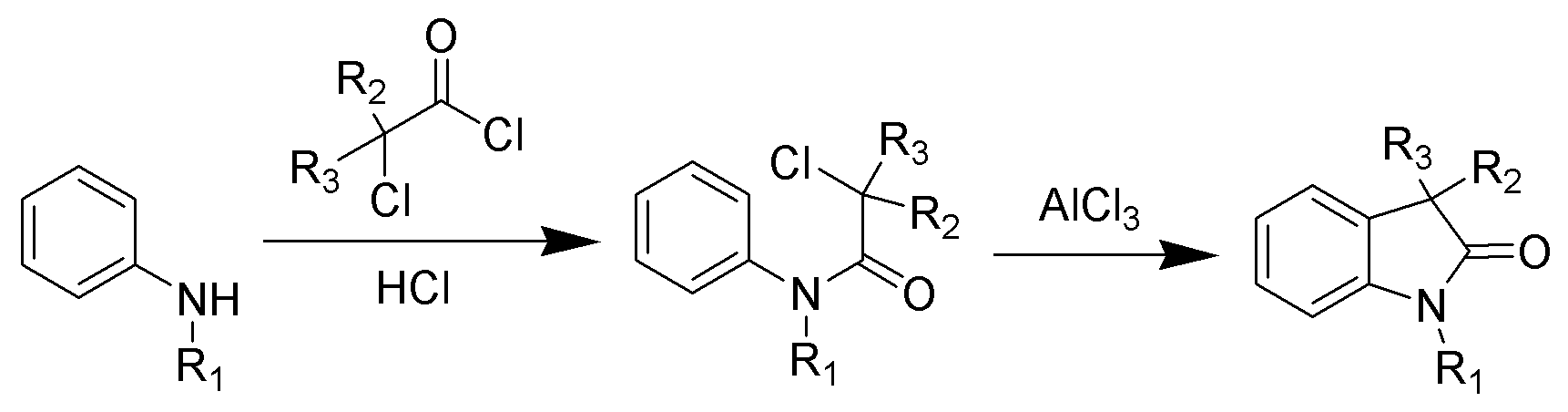
The Stollé synthesis

The first step is an amide coupling, while the second step is a Friedel–Crafts reaction. An improved procedure has been developed.

== See also ==
- Indole
- Hinsberg oxindole synthesis
