= Alfred Kast =

German internist (1856–1903)

Alfred Kast (25 July 1856 in Illenau, near Achern – 7 January 1903) was a German internist.

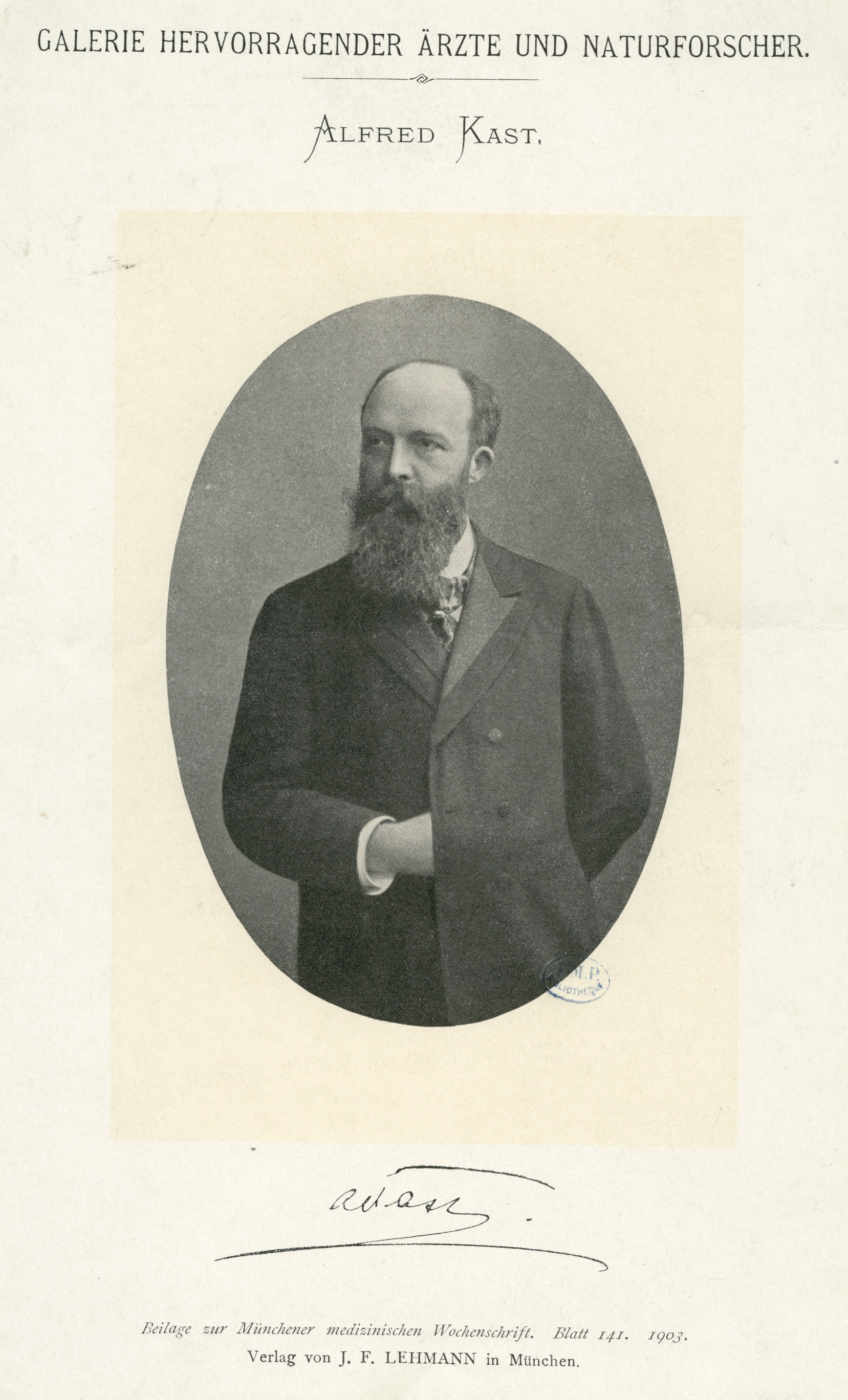
Alfred Kast

He studied medicine at the Universities of Heidelberg, Freiburg and Leipzig, earning his doctorate in 1879. He served as an assistant to Wilhelm Heinrich Erb (1840–1921) in Heidelberg, Julius Friedrich Cohnheim (1839–1884) in Leipzig, and from 1881 was a clinical assistant to Christian Bäumler (1836–1933) at Freiburg. Here he also worked in the physiological-chemical institute. In 1886, he became an associate professor, followed by a directorship at Eppendorf Hospital in Hamburg (1888). He 1892 he was named professor of internal medicine at the University of Breslau.

Kast was instrumental in introducing phenacetin and the sulphonal group of drugs into medicine. His name is associated with "Kast’s syndrome", a condition synonymous to Mafucci syndrome.

== Written works ==
With surgeon Theodor Rumpel (1862–1923), he was co-author of an illustrated patho-anatomical atlas called: Pathologisch-anatomische Tafeln nach frischen Präparaten mit erläuterndem anatomisch-klinischem Text (Patho-anatomical panels for fresh preparations with explanatory anatomical-clinical text). Other works by Kast include:

- Ueber die Wirkung des Acetphenetidins. Written with chemist Oscar Hinsberg (1857-1939). Centralblatt für die medicinischen Wissenschaften, Berlin, 1887, 25: 145-148. On the introduction of phenacetin.
- Sulfonal, ein neues Schlafmittel. Berliner klinische Wochenschrift, 1888, 25: 309-314. On the introduction of sulphonal, earlier discovered by Eugen Baumann (1846-1896).
