= Édouard Muller (businessman) =

Swiss-French businessman (1885–1948)

Édouard Muller (February 16, 1885 – September 28, 1948) was a Swiss-French businessman who expanded Nestlé's international operations, and succeeded Louis Dapples as CEO from 1937 until his sudden death in 1948.

== Childhood ==
Edouard Muller was born on February 16, 1885, the son of Edouard Johann Muller, and grandson of Johann Muller owner of a gasthouse (large inn), who was born in Untersiggenthal in canton of Aargau, Switzerland. His father moved from his home village to seek gardening work in the shores area of Lac Leman. His father found employment at the home called La Beque, owned by the family of a wealthy founder of the Nestlé company whose family patriarch was Emil-Louis Roussy who served on the Nestle Board of Directors from 1905 until 1920. Edouard Johann earned acclaim in the Vaud Horticultural Society while employed by the Roussy's and he married Philippine Denereaz from nearby Chardonne and Corsier. Edouard Johann and Philippine had two children, Rose and Edouard Muller. They enjoyed the lakeside, the gardens, the orchard and the Roussy yacht “Vesta”. Young Edouard explored the old underground passages of the old castle of La Tour-de-Peilz. His schooling records were good but noted some indiscipline. His formal education ended at age 16.

== Early business career ==
Muller started his outside employment career with the bank Credit Leman at age 16 as an apprentice. He was fired in three days because he played a trick on a friend. Or so he thought. He locked the door at lunchtime expecting his friend to look through the old large keyhole of the door to see what he could to explain why the door was locked. When Edouard squirted water through the hole after the rattling when the next person came to enter, he squished that water into the manager's eye. He was excused for his youthful indiscretion and remained there for two years.

== Nestlé ==
Muller was given an introduction to start employment at Nestlé when Emil-Louis Roussy used his influence to help the 18-year-old. Edouard became the corresponding secretary for Alfred Liotard, who together with Louis Aguet headed Nestle's overseas business starting October 1, 1903. Edouard was multi-lingual at this time. He spoke German, French and English. He enjoyed the hectic pace of work after the mail arrived by boat monthly. Edouard became friends with Ariste Lehmann, another Swiss in England and they saved and ventured to Paris to enjoy its cultures that differed from those in London. He did not enjoy the gray and damp London weather and longed for the warmer lakeside climate he grew up in. Edouard's first manager's position was in the Chocolate Export Department. In 1908 he was made manager of the South American Department. He was later made manager of the Near East Agencies covering the Balkans, Greece, Turkey, Syria, Palestine, and Mesopotamia. The headquarters to one of the countries was in Constantinople, now Istanbul. Liotard suggested Edouard move to Constantinople which was happily accepted by Edouard and his family. Arriving there in 1911 at the age of twenty-six he conceived the idea of promoting chocolate sales among women by including movie-coupons in the wrappers. The war between the Turks and the Bulgarians soon forced a move for Edouard and his family to Athens, where they lived at the Hotel de Grand Bretagne and then at a rented home in Kephica.

== World War I ==
World War I started in August 1914 while Edouard was in the Near-East where British and German forces were active. Condensed milk and chocolate were very much in demand for the troops. Moving goods was a constant problem with some items being scarce and travel was difficult because individuals needed special military permits. Edouard worked with gentlemen Nestlé associates named Brander, Riggenbach, and Gredinger who were also Swiss citizens. Edouard was in Salonika during a five o'clock in the morning bombing led by the Germans. A squadron of 20 airplanes dropped bombs. The zeppelin could not reach Salonika according to Edward. He, while still in his pajamas, jumped into a small boat with someone from the Hotel Olympos and watched the bombing. The target district was where the customs offices were near the Olympos Hotel. He noted in a letter to his wife that business had deteriorated because no one wanted to stock up at this time. Edouard wanted to centralize near East operations in Egypt but the military would not provide such a permit. Edouard therefore centralized activities in Athens. Once while in Athens when the city was a target for bombing from battleships Edouard used his body to cover his son and protect him in the staircase of the hotel in which they were staying.

Edouard was appointed a delegate of the Swiss Red Cross which allowed him access to Swiss diplomatic pouches. Edouard was asked favors by persons wanting to use that diplomatic pouch. Edouard did have to obtain dismissal at a military court of spying charges as a result of suspicions. As the First World War was drawing to an end Nestlé move the Muller family to Paris where it now had one of its headquarters. Nestlé at this time was in trouble due to the huge stocks of products, including large quantities of sweetened condensed milk with coffee flavor. To sell products a good deal of traveling was necessary. Edouard traveled to Egypt in sweltering heat. In 1918 the British troops were still in Egypt and they could use the goods he had to dispose of.

Edouard was promoted to manager for the European and Latin American markets at the Paris headquarters. Edouard faced a surplus of canned food for which demand had dropped and disposal became a difficulty. All merchants faced difficult times as well. Nestlé and the Anglo-Swiss Milk Company did not escape the financial crisis that developed after the 1914 to 1918 war. The company had suffered such losses that the nominal value of its shares had to be cut in half in 1921. Creditor banks took some control over the organization and lent additional monies to the business and controlled the corporate recovery to some degree. Louis Dapples, a Swiss who had been living in Italy, with a long banking career and international ties was appointed chairman and chief executive officer of Nestlé. At that time, Nestlé had several head offices including London, Paris, Cham, and Vevey. After a reorganization forced managers in those four locations to quit, Muller was sent all over Europe to report on the actual situation facing various branches of the Nestlé group. Muller was away from home for months at a time collecting information and creating numerous reports. Edouard held the opinion that the foundation of Nestlé was still in a healthy condition.

== Inter-war years ==
After this extensive field research work, Muller was made a general manager of Nestlé. Dapples wished to relocate the head office to London; Muller simply refused to go. He had not liked the weather in London when he was stationed there before. Dapples then asked if Muller would consider staying in Switzerland in Vevey, to which he readily agreed. Many key Nestlé men moved from London and Paris and Cham to consolidate headquarters in Vevey. Edouard faced considerable corporate jealousy due to his new position. Edouard had to take many driving journeys to France, Germany, Spain, and other countries to keep full control over the reorganization and marketing activities. He had very little time to spend at home. When Muller was at home, had a massage at 7:00 AM and then reviewed mail in the quiet of his home because he would not have a quiet moment at work. Generally, his work day in Vevey started at 9:00 AM and continued to 7:00 PM. During travel, his days were usually even longer. Edouard lost his first wife, Jeanne Levillain from Paris, to sepsis in 1929. Edouard had married Jeanne, a blonde secretary in early 1910, when he was 25. They had three children: two sons who were grown and a young daughter.

Edouard married his second wife, Else Ellen Margery Hemmeler, in Zurich on October 7, 1930. In 1931 Edouard and Ellen took the boat-train from Paris to Le Havre and then left on the SS Paris for a six-day cruise. This was the first trip to the US for the couple. They stayed at the Roosevelt Hotel in New York City. Edouard had business at the Nestle offices on Lafayette Street. After the NYC stay, they traveled to Cuba via Key West on a train and then to Cuba by boat. On their return by train, they met a Cuban friend of Edouard's who shared with them his contraband alcohol in their Pullman car. It was during prohibition. They returned through Miami staying at the Pancoast Hotel. Then returned through New York where they were entertained by Hardenberg, a Nestle Manager in New York, and continued to Niagara Falls en route to Montreal. They returned to Europe, sailing from Quebec on the SS Empress of Australia to Liverpool.

Edouard took many trips in the Renault convertible from France to Spain. They went via Madrid, Barcelona, Sevilla, Algeciras and Gibraltar. They were entertained by Nestle officials in each small factory location including Trais, a Nestle legal advisor, Pfersich in Santander, and Jaime de Semir, who became the Chairman of Nestle in Spain, in Sitges.

Hardenberg was succeeded as Nestle manager in New York by Daniel F. Norton, President of Nestle, succeeding Louis Dapples as Nestle President. In the spring of 1935, Edouard and Ellen returned to New York for their second trip via Genua aboard the Conte di Savoia in May. They stayed at the new Waldorf Astoria Hotel and then went to Cuba with the Dan Norton's. They toured the Nestle factory in Sancti Spiritu. They visited Veracruz and Mexico City by train and Teotihuacan and Chapultepec and a factory in Ocotlan. They went by train to Mazatlan and then sailed to Los Angeles. They returned to New York by train.

In the spring of 1936, Muller was in Madrid, Spain staying at the Ritz Hotel, experiencing the sentiments of the Spanish Civil War that broke out that year. Nestle had their Spanish headquarters in Barcelona. Those offices were taken over by the revolutionary workers’ committee. Edouard's good friend Jaime de Semir was a declared a loyalist and he was charged for crimes and condemned to death. He fled to the sanctuary of Edouard's home in La Tour de Peilz, Switzerland via protection of the French Consulate aboard a French battleship that left Barcelona from Marseille. The de Semir family returned to San Sebastien in 1937, an area that had not been taken over by the revolutionaries.

In 1937, Dapples died shortly after a trans-Atlantic trip to his home in Genua. Muller had secretly assured that a doctor discreetly accompany the Dappleses during the trip on the ship. That helped ease Dapples's pain but did not improve his condition. Edouard was elected chairman and chief executive officer of the Nestle-Anglo Swiss Condensed Milk Company in August 1937, the month of Dapples's death. In September 1937, Edouard and Ellen went to the Mediterranean for both pleasure and business. They toured Delphie, Mikaene, Olympos, Athens and Kyphissia and historical sites of the area. They toured the offices in Athens and Istanbul where they toured the chocolate factory. They sailed to Smyrna, where they toured the factories processing figs and raisins. They cruised on the Milwaukee, ending their trip on October 12 returning to Milan by car. Edouard then turned to more Swiss business requirements of the new corporation head. He dined with the Brandts of Omega, at Colonel Divisionnaire Henri Guisan's (later the General of the Swiss Army in 1939), at Mr. and Mrs. Schulthess, then the President of the Swiss Confederation. Other heads of state included Mr. and Mrs. Musy and Mr. Pilet-Golaz.

Muller addressed the General Assembly of Nestle-Anglo-Swiss Condensed Milk Company as its president in April 1938 at Cham. Present were C. J. Abegg, G. Huguenin, M. Patternot, A. Perrochet and P. Visinand. Edouard's third trip to the United States was in May 1938 via the S.S. Normandy, leaving from LeHavre with about 950 passengers on a five-day crossing. They started in the Waldorf Towers and then toured factories in Columbus, Ohio, Sunbury, Marysville, and Greenville. After meetings in New York, they sailed to Cuba on the S.S. Roma for three days of factory tours and then sailed to Crisotbal, Panama on the steamer Veraqua. Blau, the Nestle manager in Panama, took them to Colon and through the Panama Canal and then by train to Panama City. They drove over 100 miles to the La Venta area to visit the factory being built in Nata. They returned to Cristobal to sail to Kingston, Jamaica to see the Minister of Agriculture regarding Nestle business in Jamaica, where they stayed at the Myrtle Bank Hotel. They sailed to Haiti and then sailed on the S.S. Santa Rosa to New York. They returned to Europe on the Normandy at the end of June, arriving in Le Havre after five days at sea and taking a train to Paris and then returned home.

== World War II ==
The fall of 1938 led to an agreement signed on September 29, by Chamberlain, Hitler, and Mussolini in Munich, that there would be no war. In late October, Edouard and Ellen toured Germany, Frankfurt, and the Nestle factory in Hattersheim. They went to Hamburg and to the factory in Kappeln. In Berlin, they stayed at the Adlon Hotel, Unter den Linden. Business affairs took place at the Sarotti offices in Tempelhof. During the visit, they noticed signs indicating “air raid shelter” in the hotel and at the theater. When Edouard returned to Switzerland, he ordered 150 suitcases to be sent to the Vevey office. His plan was that if war was to be started all the important papers of Nestle should be sent to the London office.

In February 1939 on a ski trip to Arosa with his friend and business associate H. Riggenbach from the Berlin office, they reviewed the political situation in Germany. They agreed that the situation was desperate. Muller signed a declaration of moral rearmament. Shortly thereafter, Hitler's troops marched into Czechoslovakia. During his work trip to a board meeting of the Credit Suisse in April in Zürich, he also went to the United States Consulate. There he obtained immigration visas to go to the United States.

He planned a trip to the United States and South America for his family and to visit factories in those countries. On June 1, 1939, on the SS Washington, they had their daughters in tow, ages thirteen, seven, and six. Their son Roland remained in Switzerland completing his doctorate in Zürich and their son Andre went back to Spain, working for Nestlé.

The trip started in New York, where they enjoyed the New York World's Fair. There were numerous business affairs to attend to in New York. In early July, the family left for South America on the White Star line of Barbados. They landed in Rio de Janeiro and left Santos, arriving in Montevideo on August 1. Edouard toured the factory there with Nicanor Fernandez. The following day, they arrived in Buenos Aires and stayed at the Alvear Palace Hotel. Edouard met the president of Argentina, Dr. Ortiz, at an auction for Champion Bull. Fernandez accompanied the couple to Chile for a week of inspection of the Nestlé organization there. The children were left in Buenos Aires with their governess. They left Argentina on August 21 on the SS Avilaof the British Star Line. They returned to Brazil on August 27 after enduring a trip when all portholes were darkened due to German submarines in the surrounding waters. While in Rio de Janeiro' they received word that Hitler declared war against Poland on September 1. England and France declared war against Germany on September 3. Consequently, Edouard had many meetings, cables, and discussions including one with the Minister of Switzerland, Traversini. Concluding that Switzerland would be surrounded by warring factions, Edouard decided for the family to emigrate to the United States.

The family departed for New York on the SS Brazil on September 6. Edward's pre-planning for contingency developments then took place. The heads of the international departments, and the technical and accounting departments who already had their immigration visas, began to arrive in New York via London. The many suitcases with the import documents for Nestlé were sent to New York. Nestlé would be able to transfer royalties and international income through Panama through Unilac, Inc. Some of the important Nestlé managers, and their families, that moved were Guy Parker, Gustave Huguenin, Pepin, Dommens, Menziz, F. Gysler, and Dr. Warner Oppikofer, the legal advisor. Therefore, many more, including secretaries, who had Nestlé pre-agreed their contingency departure.

The Nestlé offices were at 44th St. in New York. One of the responsibilities was to find housing for the incoming employees and additional office space. Edouard Muller settled at One Atlantic Street in Stamford, Connecticut for additional office space.

Edouard and the family settled in a rented house on the Sound at Smithfield Point. It reminded them of their lakeside home in La Tour De Peilz. The family recognized that US citizens had no understanding of the horrors of war that they had experienced while in Europe.

At the end of June 1940, Andre Muller arrived in New York on the SS Washington from Spain. It had been impossible to get his passage on the only plane flying from Lisbon to the US. Ticket sales had entered into a black market. His ship had been stopped by a German submarine while en route. Passengers were forced to jump into lifeboats and dangle over the ocean until the Germans understood their mistake since the United States was not yet at war with them. The incident made New York newspapers. Andre returned via LaGuardia Airfield on a Yankee clipper for Lisbon in August.

Edouard developed his contacts with the assistance of Daniel Norton and other Nestlé employees in the United States. Edward met Homer Cummings, Atty. Gen. of the United States and friend of President F. D. Roosevelt. He played at the Pinehurst Golf Course for the Homer Cummings Tournament and was able to network with many US leaders and senators to the benefit of Nestlé.

October 1, 1943, was the 40th anniversary celebration for Edouard Muller having joined Nestle-Anglo-Swiss Milk Company in London in 1903. A private party at his house was done first and the event was again commemorated at the annual Christmas party for Nestle at the Roosevelt Hotel in New York City. After the bombing of Pearl Harbor, Edouard's advice about Europe become more sought after by US heads of state and industry. Many high-level meetings took place with Swiss and US business interested people. Edouard and family stayed in touch with expatriated Swiss nationals while in the US. The Nestle annual Christmas party was given in 1945 after the end of the war. Things were returning to normalcy. Gas rationing had ended.

== Post-war years ==
Muller was a co-sponsor for the "Declaration of European Interdependence", advocating that "only a continental confederation can coordinate the common political, economic and military interests of Europe and the personal rights of all Europeans." This concept was in an article was presented on March 26, 1945, in Time Magazine. The principal sponsor of the declaration was Count Richard N. Coudenhove-Kalergi, a visiting professor of history at New York University.

In the summer of 1946, Edouard and Ellen Muller went to Canada and visited the factories in Toronto and Fulton. Edouard was dismayed by the lack of distribution of Nestle products in Montreal and Quebec and so he redirected his brother-in-law, a Nestle employee who had been destined to go to the Dutch Indies but had been refused by the government, to develop the markets in Canada. Rolf Hemmeler and his family became stationed in Toronto in November 1946. Edouard arranged a reorganization of the Stamford offices by having A. Perrochet and R. de Salis move to the US to perform the task as Edouard prepared to return to Switzerland and the Vevey offices. On March 19, 1947, Edouard Muller and his family returned to Le Havre on the way home on the S.S. America. They had a large reception at landing and then overnighted in Paris to return home on March 29.

Muller returned to find internal corporate rivalries within the Vevey offices. He gave a speech at an event he organized at the Casino du Rivage in Vevey called “L’Amerique, un people sur roués”. His speech was noted as demonstrating his kindness, cheer, guidance and leadership. Muller was involved in secret negotiations with the Maggi Group. They worked with Credit Swiss and the federal government and the President of Maggi, C. J. Abegg. Most meetings were in Zurich or Bern. In April 1948, the successful merger was approved by the general assembly of the shareholders and the company changed names from the Nestle-Anglo-Swiss Milk Company to Nestle Alimentana.

== Retirement ==
On May 21, 1948, the family returned to Connecticut on the S. S. America for the June 19 wedding of their oldest daughter. On July 16, they departed for South America to have a working vacation, as usual. They ported at Santa Paula, Curaçao and in Venezuela. They went on car trips to factories and met with location managers to get briefed on operations. Edouard weighed the idea of going to Australia to see operations there but recognized that he was too important an employee for the corporation to allow the three months of absence from the offices to do so. He would have to rely on reports from those factories and offices. Muller felt that air travel was too risky for him for the same reasons.

In August 1948, Muller went to the West Coast with the Dan Norton couple to see operations there. They were also scoping out the possibility of having US Nestle operations in the Midwest somewhere. They traveled on the 20th Century Railroad from New York to Chicago and then took the City of Portland train to Portland, Oregon. Then they traveled by train to Oakland and took the ferry to San Francisco. They visited the factory in San Jose. Then they went again by train with much luggage to Los Angeles and stayed at the Beverly Wilshire Hotel for four days. The employees toured many places in the greater LA area.

The Mullers left on August 16 for the Grand Canyon. In Colorado Springs, where they stayed at The Broadmoor resort, Edouard met with local officials to discuss the possibility of building Nestle US headquarters in their city. He and Dan Norton had visited several building sites and locations suitable for such a headquarters. Edouard felt unrest remained in both the Pacific and the Atlantic so he was seeking a place remote from the coasts as long-term planning for Nestle.

The family returned by train through Denver to Chicago to New York to Stamford. Edouard complained of a headache on September 15, 1948. At 10:30 AM at work, he collapsed with a temperature of 104° and was nearly unconscious. Doctors felt it was a cerebral hemorrhage. He died of an abscess behind his left ear that developed into an infection of the brain on September 28, 1948. He was 63 years old.

== Management philosophy ==
At Credit Leman, Muller witnessed a peasant wanting to borrow 5 francs to buy a scythe because he had nothing and needed to earn money. Edouard remembered other incidents of those who needed to borrow to live. He did not forget that experience.

Humor
Muller has many examples during his life in which he demonstrated his good sense of humor. There is a photo of him in Taormina in 1930 with ears held in place on his head made from cactus sections. He also had his wife hold a camel in 1937 in front of an Egyptian pyramid. And in 1935 when he and friends and Ellen went to The Brown Derby in Los Angeles upon departure made some autograph hunters happy by signing for himself “Tom Collins” and his friends en suite signed as “John Haig” and as “Johnny Walker”. He also sent home photos of him seated on boxes in front of his tent in the desert while selling products and of him waiting at a railway station with many suitcase and trunks declaring on the photo “Poor me”.

Gather intelligence
In 1918 Edouard used his intelligence to gather information about the stern and serious quartermaster who was a colonel. He learned from a bartender that the colonel collected scarabs and was quite a specialist in that field. So Edouard bought several cheap scarabs and added to them an old and expensive one. When Edouard showed the scarabs wrapped in a cloth to the bartender at the colonel glanced over and of course got involved in the conversation with Edouard. Edouard sold an entire lot of sweetened condensed milk with coffee flavor to the colonel who of course likely gained a rare scarab.

Know your employees
Edouard almost daily ate his meals with staff at the Epicure, across the street from the offices where they ate in the back of the kitchen in casual surroundings. He entertained often at his home and organized trips and events for staff. He took staff on working vacation retreats where much problem-solving took place.

Not be too ostentatious
Muller refused the suggestion in the early 1940s to buy a Cadillac, the top-of-the-line car in the US and instead bought a Packard. He reasoned he could buy two cars for the price of one Cadillac and they were not as showy.

== Personal life ==
Edouard married a blonde secretary, Jeanne Levillain, from Paris in early 1910. He was 25. His father died after a brief illness in April 1914 at the age of 64. Edouard was 29. His mother did not die until the late 1950s or early 1960s. His first child, a son, Andre, was born in 1911. The home he occupied in La Tour de Peilz was initially constructed as a vacation home. As his family grew, Edouard decided to build a second smaller house on the large property along Lake Geneva. The home was built for his mother Philippine Denereaz-Muller in 1928. It was called Villa La Basque. His mother had lived in Edouard's house during his absence. The new home had a room for laundry and garden tools and a garage, something lacking at his own home. At the same time, he added a winter garden called the Jardin d’Hiver to his home. Son Roland was born in Athens just before the family moved to Paris in 1918. He was born in a downstairs room facing the Place de le Constitution in the Hotel Grande Bretagne. That room was the hotel bar in 1937. Daughter Micheline was born March 9, 1926. Edouard lost his first wife Jeanne in 1929 after she succumbed to sepsis.

Edouard married his second wife, Else Ellen Margery Hemmeler, in Zurich on October 7, 1930. He had met her during a business trip attending to the Galak Company. She was the daughter of the manager of the company. They had met in 1926 when she had brought a gift for the new daughter to the Muller house. They had seen each other at a New Year's celebration in 1928–1929 in the Netherlands. The courtship started in February 1930 with a box of chocolates and a request to be able to write the young college student studying in Berlin and completing her studies in Lausanne, Switzerland. Their honeymoon was a tour of Italy by car. Edouard and Ellen had their first daughter in December 1931. Their second was born on New Year's of January 1933. With these two additions, the attic of the home was expanded to make two bedrooms and a playroom. His home had a staff of five: cook, chauffeur, gardener, maid, and governess. On March 21, 1943, Lieutenant Roland Muller, Edouard's second son, was killed during a Swiss military exercise. The family received news of the death with no explanation at first. It took three days to get more details about the tragedy, which was a tank accident in Curtilles with the ground concealed Roland, age 25.

In 1947–1948, the Mullers added a large addition to their home including a two-car garage, a studio and office with a large bathroom and kitchenette with a large view of Lac Leman. The architect started work in 1947 after the family returned from Connecticut. They returned with two cars, a Pontiac and his wife's Cadillac.

Edouard only smoked Havana cigars and kept them carefully in a humidor. He never smoked cigarettes. Edouard enjoyed good food and wines and liked to search out restaurants with specialties like crayfish soup, country ham, and wild berries, and cream with meringues. He became a Chevalier of the Chevaliers du Taste-Vin in 1948. Boating and fishing were a favorite pastime. Edouard enjoyed fishing for lake perch which were fried and served. He organized long walks through the Swiss Alps with the associate expert mountaineer, Jean Fatton. Edouard had an automobile early after their first availability in Switzerland. However, Edouard chose to never drive. He was always driven. His vehicles tend to be the very long and large automobiles with the rear for passengers separated by glass partition from the driver. He wore a driver's leather helmet. Edouard enjoyed good Swiss cheese and wines. The family cook who lived with them throughout his life, Therese, was an excellent chef. Edouard collected stamps with his second wife. It was a good portable hobby for when she traveled with him and friends and business associates from around the world traded stamps with them. Edouard enjoyed skiing and did so in Gstaad, Davos and Arosa. Edouard was an Abraham Lincoln buff. He read about him extensively. He was given statuary of the past president for his office and home.

== Nestlé social works ==
Nestle donated funds to the Canton of Vaud for building the Nestle Hospital in Lausanne. The Pouponierre, a medical health facility for babies, was created as a charity organization with Muller and Dapples. It opened in September 1938. Bell carillon donation to the First Presbyterian Church in Stamford, Connecticut for the kindness given to Nestlé employees through use of the parking lot when war years forced a need for a quick corporate solution in the United States for Nestle.

== Awards ==
- Edouard was made a Knight of the Turkish Imperial Order of Osmania in 1913, a reward for his work for the Red Crescent during the Turkish-Bulgarian War.
- In 1918, the Greek government made Edouard a Knight of the Order of Savior of Greece for reactivating trade after World War I.
- In France the Order of the Légion d'honneur, first as a chevalier and some years later as an Officer, was bestowed upon Edouard by the government because he was a member of the French Red Cross and he acted numerous times as a link between many international agencies for prisoners of World War I.
- In 1929 the King of Spain, Alphonso XIII, made Edouard the Commander of the Order Del Merito Civil for all he had done to modernize the dairy industry. This was a rather rare distinction.
- Edouard was awarded a Doctoris honoris causa from the University of Lausanne in the same year that Benito Mussolini was given his in about the late 1930s.
- Lincoln Memorial University, Harrogate, Tennessee, bestowed the degree of Doctor of Laws on Edouard in June 1945 at the same time as it was granted to the Governor of Virginia.
- Army and Navy E, for Effort and Efficiency, was awarded to Edouard and his Nestle co-worker Daniel Norton in Columbus, Ohio.
- Doctor of Humane Letters from the College of Washington and Jefferson in Washington, Pennsylvania in April 1945.
- Citoyen d’Honneur of the Ville de Vevey, September 1947. He shared the event by inviting all the dignitaries for dinner and a tour to the Nestle factory in Broc to share the honor and merit with the employees because that was where he felt the success was best placed.

== Successor ==
He was succeeded by Maurice Paternot and André Perrochet in Vevey.

== Works ==
He was the author of the essay "Personality in Business" and other management writings.
