= Georg Jochmann =

Georg Jochmann (11 October 1874, in Liegnitz – 6 January 1915, in Berlin) was a German internist and bacteriologist, who specialized in infectious diseases.

In 1898 he received his medical doctorate at the University of Freiburg, and following graduation, worked as an assistant to Bernhard Fischer at the Institute of Hygiene in Kiel. Afterwards, he worked in the department of internal medicine at Hamburg-Eppendorf Hospital under Theodor Rumpel, and at the university medical clinic in Breslau under Alfred Kast and Adolph Strümpell. In 1904 he obtained his habilitation for internal medicine at the University of Breslau.

In 1906 he was named head of the department of infections at Rudolf-Virchow-Krankenhaus in Berlin, and four years later received the title of professor. He died in 1915 at the age of 40 from spotted typhus, contracted while treating Russian prisoners of war. His body rests at Stahnsdorf South-Western Cemetery near Berlin.

== Associated terms ==
- "Jochmann's serum": Serum from immunized horses used in the treatment of epidemic meningitis.
- "Müller-Jochmann test": A method for differentiating between tuberculous and non-tuberculous pus; term named with internist Eduard Müller.

== Selected works ==
- Über Immunotherapie beim Scharlach, 1912 – On immunotherapy in scarlet fever.
- Pocken und Vaccinationslehre, 1913 – Smallpox and vaccination.
- Leukocyten-Fermente und -Antifermente; In: Kolle and Wassermann's "Handbuch der pathogenen Mikroorganismen" 2nd edition, Volume 2, 1913 – Leukocyte ferments and antiferments.
- Lehrbuch der Infektionskrankheiten, 1914 – Textbook of infectious diseases.
