= Jašek =

Jašek (feminine: Jašková) or Jasek is a surname. It may refer to:

== Jašek ==
- Jaroslav Jašek (1946–2010), orienteering competitor who competed for Czechoslovakia
- Lukáš Jašek (born 1997), Czech ice hockey player

== Jasek ==
- Magdalena Jasek, Polish fashion model
- Richard Jasek (born 1964/1965), Czechoslovakia-born Australian television producer, writer and director
