= Theodor Rumpel (surgeon) =

German surgeon (1862–1923)

Theodor Rumpel (25 March 1862, Gütersloh – 11 August 1923, Hamburg) was a German surgeon remembered for describing the Rumpel-Leede sign.

He received his doctorate in 1887 in Marburg and worked at the Hamburg-Eppendorf Hospital. He oversaw the building of the Barmbecker Krankenhaus in Hamburg, of which he became director in 1913. Among his better known assistants at Hamburg was bacteriologist Georg Jochmann.

With internist Alfred Kast, he was co-author of a patho-anatomical atlas titled: Pathologisch-anatomische Tafeln nach frischen Präparaten mit erläuterndem anatomisch-klinischem Text.
