= Ellen Baumler =

Montana historian and author

- Born: Boddington; March 8, 1949; Kansas City
- Died: December 16, 2023 (aged 74)
- Alma mater: University of Kansas
- Occupation: Historian, author
- Employer: Montana Historical Society

Ellen Baumler (March 8, 1949 – December 16, 2023) was a Montana historian and author. She worked at the Montana Historical Society as an interpretive historian from 1992 to 2018. As an advocate for historic preservation she wrote books and articles, created walking tours, researched and created more than 1600 interpretive signs and historical markers for the Montana Department of Transportation, and worked to register Montana locations on the National Register of Historic Places. As an author she published multiple books on the history of haunted places in Montana. She hosted "History on the Go", a podcast of quirky Montana history, for Cherry Creek Radio.

== Early life and education ==
Ellen Boddington was born on March 8, 1949, in Kansas City. Her parents were Jeanne and Edward "Bud" Boddington.

Baumler received a PhD in 1985, majoring in English, classics, and history from the University of Kansas.

Ellen Boddington married Mark Baumler, and moved from Tucson, Arizona to Helena, Montana, in 1988.

== Career ==
In 1992 Ellen Baumler joined the Montana Historical Society as the first Interpretive Historian in Montana. She remained there throughout a 26-year career, retiring in 2018. After her official retirement, she continued to research and write.

Baumler has been recognized for her "exemplary commitment, effort, and impact in identifying, preserving, and presenting Montana’s historical and cultural heritage". Baumler's contributions include authoring more than 1600 interpretive signs; adding locations to the National Register of Historic Places; delivery of thousands of educational outreach programs statewide; and publishing blog posts, articles and books. She also hosted "History on the Go", a podcast of quirky Montana history, for Cherry Creek Radio.

As an author Baumler published at least twelve books, including Montana Moments and Untold Stories of Montana Minorities. Sometimes referred to as the "Queen of Halloween", she was particularly interested in the history of haunted places in Montana, writing multiple books on the subject, such as Spirit Tailings. She also edited Girl from the Gulches, an account of life in early Montana recounted by Mary Ronan.

== Awards and honors ==
- 2023: Montana Heritage Keeper Award, Montana Historical Society Trustees (ceremony in Reeder's Alley)
- 2023: Award for Outstanding Contributions to Historic Preservation, Montana State Historic Preservation Office (SHPO) of the Montana Historical Society (ceremony at Myrna Loy Theater)
- 2017: Peter Yegen, Jr. Award, Montana Association of Museums
- 2011: Governor's Award for the Humanities, Montana
