= Nicole Bäumler =

German politician (born 1986)

Member of the Landtag of Bavaria
- Incumbent
- Assumed office 30 October 2023
- Constituency: Upper Palatinate

Personal details
- Born: 1986 (age 39–40)
- Party: Social Democratic Party (since 2010)

Nicole Bäumler (born 1986) is a German politician serving as a member of the Landtag of Bavaria since 2023. She has served as chairwoman of the Social Democratic Party in Neustadt an der Waldnaab since 2021.
