= Édouard Muller (painter) =

French painter

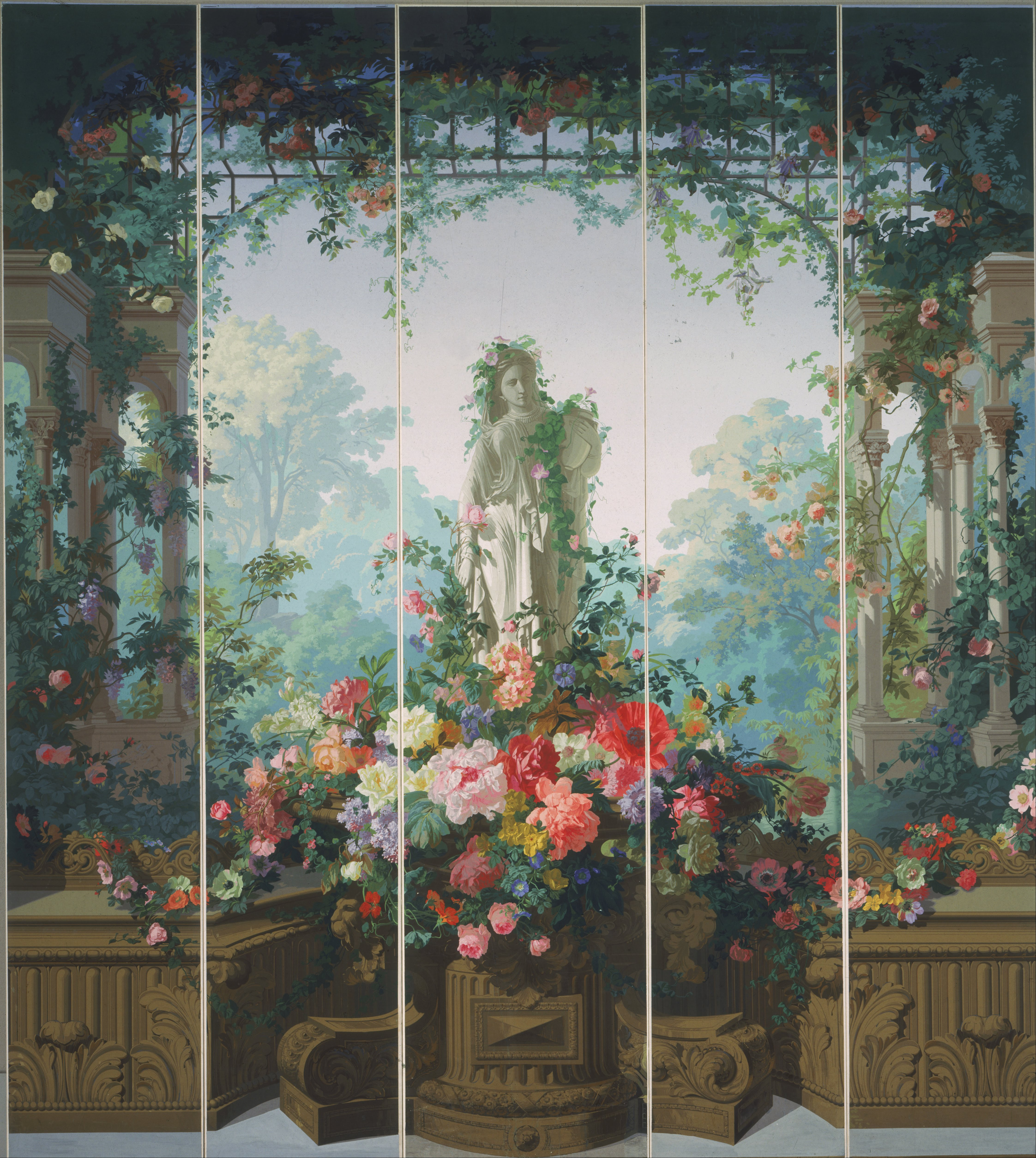
Garden of Armida wallpaper, 1854. Philadelphia Museum of Art.

Édouard Muller (born 26 September 1823 in Mulhouse, France; died on 29 December 1876 in Nogent-sur-Marne, France) was a French painter and designer. He is best remembered for his designs "Le Jardin d'Hiver," "Le Jardin d'Armide" (1854) and "La Galerie de Flore" (1856–57) for the Jules Desfossé company. He also produced painted panels for the Zuber company at Rixheim.
