= Hinsberg reaction =

Chemical test to distinguish primary, secondary & tertiary amines

The Hinsberg reaction is a chemical test for the detection of primary, secondary and tertiary amines. The reaction was first described by Oscar Hinsberg in 1890. In this test, the amine is shaken well with the Hinsberg reagent (benzenesulfonyl chloride) in the presence of aqueous alkali (either KOH or NaOH). A primary amine will form a soluble sulfonamide salt. Acidification of this salt then precipitates the sulfonamide of the primary amine. A secondary amine in the same reaction will directly form an insoluble sulfonamide. A tertiary amine will not react with the original reagent (benzene sulfonyl chloride) and will remain insoluble. After adding dilute acid this insoluble amine is converted to a soluble ammonium salt. In this way the reaction can distinguish between the three types of amines.

Tertiary amines are able to react with benzenesulfonyl chloride under a variety of conditions; the test described above is not absolute. The Hinsberg test for amines is valid only when reaction speed, concentration, temperature, and solubility are taken into account.

== Reactions ==
Amines serve as nucleophiles in attacking the sulfonyl chloride electrophile, displacing chloride. The sulfonamides resulting from primary and secondary amines are poorly soluble and precipitate as solids from solution.

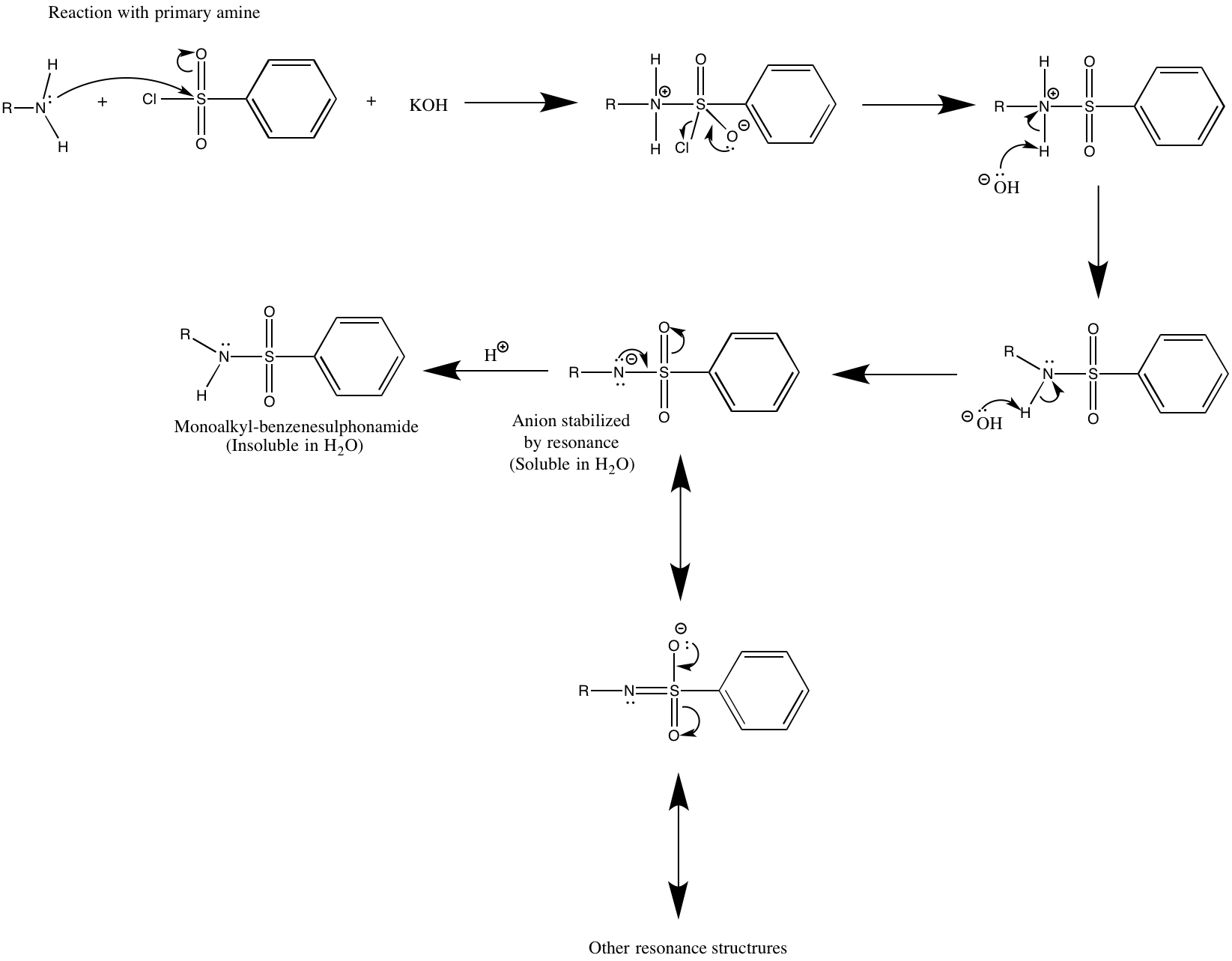

For primary amines (R' = H), the initially formed sulfonamide is deprotonated by base to give a water-soluble sulfonamide salt (Na[PhSO_{2}NR]).

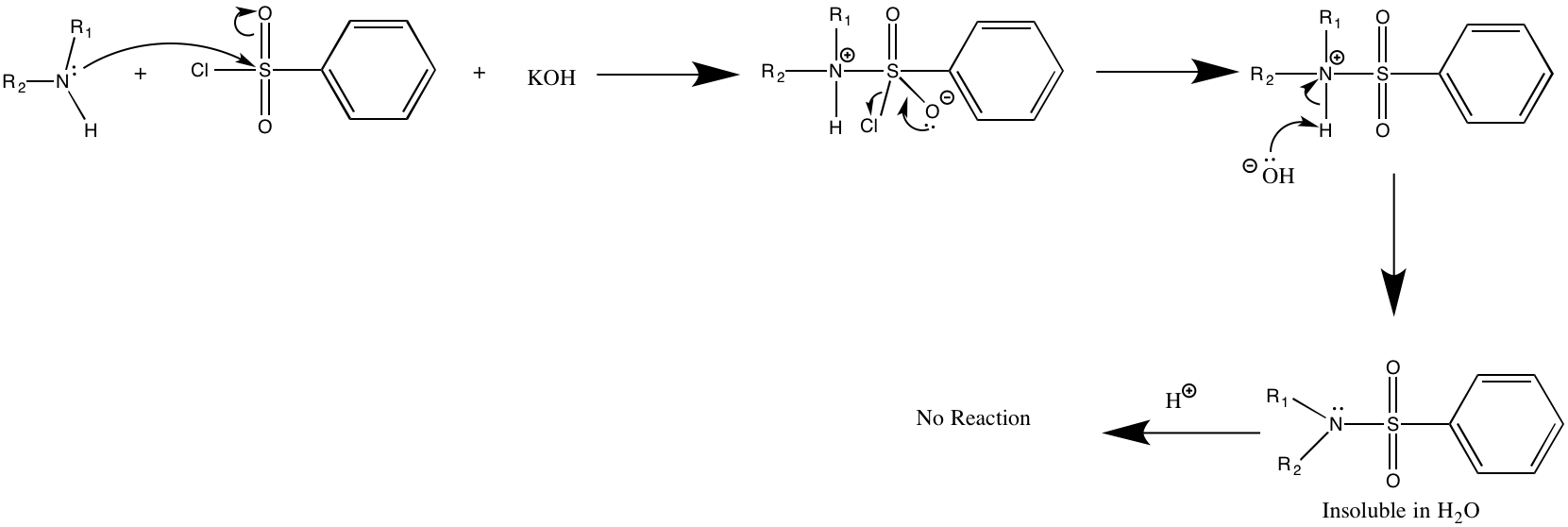

Tertiary amines promote hydrolysis of the sulfonyl chloride functional group, which affords water-soluble sulfonate salts.

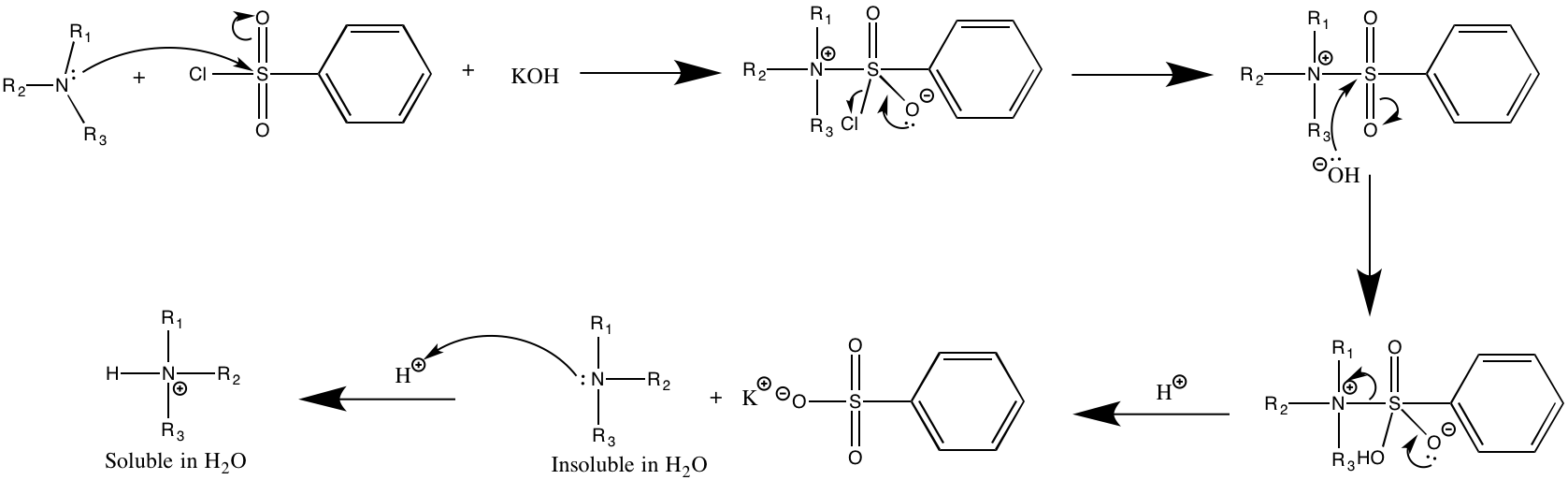
