= Oscar Hinsberg =

German chemist (1857–1939)

Oscar Heinrich Daniel Hinsberg (21 October 1857 – 13 February 1939) was a German chemist.

Hinsberg was born in Berlin, Kingdom of Prussia. In 1882 he obtained his doctorate in sciences at the University of Tübingen, later serving as a professor at the Universities of Freiburg and Geneva.

He is known for research involving synthesis of oxindole, sulfone and thiophene. In 1890 he introduced the "Hinsberg reaction", a test used for differentiation of primary, secondary and tertiary amines.

== Publications ==
- Ueber Oxalsäurederivate des Metanitroparatoluidins und des Metaparadiamidotoluols, 1882.
- Ueber die Wirkung des Acetphenetidins, (with internist Alfred Kast 1856-1903). in Centralblatt für die medicinischen Wissenschaften, Berlin, 1887, 25: 145-148. - introduction of phenacetine.
