= Eduard Müller (internist) =

German internist and neurologist

Eduard Müller (4 January 1876, in Annweiler am Trifels – 30 December 1928, in Marburg) was a German internist and neurologist.

He studied medicine at several German universities, receiving his doctorate from the University of Erlangen in 1898. Following graduation, he spent two years as an assistant at the psychiatric clinic in Freiburg under Hermann Emminghaus and Alfred Hoche, then afterwards worked as an assistant to Carl Weigert at the Senckenberg Institute of Pathology in Frankfurt am Main.

In 1903 he became an assistant in Adolph Strümpell's clinic, initially at Erlangen, and then in Breslau. In 1909 he relocated to the University of Marburg as an associate professor and director of the medical polyclinic. In 1921 he attained a full professorship.

With bacteriologist Georg Jochmann, he developed the "Müller-Jochmann test", a method of differentiating between tuberculous and non-tuberculous pus.

== Selected works ==
- Die multiple Sklerose des Gehirns und Rückenmarks, ihre Pathologie und Behandlung, 1904 – Multiple sclerosis of the brain and spinal cord, its pathology and treatment.
- Die spinale kinderlähmung : eine klinische und epidemiologische studie, 1910 – Spinal polio: a clinical and epidemiological study.
- Die Frühstadien der epidemischen Kinderlaehmung, 1912 – Early stages of the epidemic poliomyelitis.
- Die therapie des praktischen arztes (2 volumes, 1914–20; as editor) – The therapy of the practical physician.
- Die epidemische Kinderlähmung, 1925 – On epidemic poliomyelitis.
- Die Erkrankungen des Rückenmarks, 1925 – Disorders of the spinal cord.
