= Werner Jochmann =

German historian

Werner Jochmann (August 5, 1921 – November 16, 1994) was a German historian and director of the Research Centre for the History of National Socialism in Hamburg, Germany.

== Early life and career ==
Werner Jochmann grew up the son of a modest farmer. After completing the Abitur (final exams) and graduating from high school in Reichenbach in 1940, he was immediately drafted into the German defence force (Wehrmacht). In August 1941 he was wounded in Russia, and in 1942, after being discharged from the hospital, Jochmann studied history, German, geography and philosophy at Wrocław. However, he was expelled from the university due to a conflict with a communist functionary.

From 1948 to 1953 he was a teacher at a secondary school in Hamburg. In 1953 Jochmann was hired as an assistant to the historian Fritz Fischer, from the University of Hamburg, working intensively on 20th-century German history for the next seven years. In 1960 he was entrusted to the Hamburg Senate building of the former "Research Centre for the History of National Socialism" in Hamburg that he conducted 26 years to his retirement 1986th During this time, the establishment has developed into a well-known at home and abroad Institute. With the reestablishment of the Institute continued Jochmann by that not only the period of National Socialism in the narrow sense, but the history since the foundation of the Reich in 1871 was to investigate. In his era a large number of studies appeared on the political social history of Hamburg and Germany from the late 19th to the mid-20th century. The focus was on the question of the causes for the rise of Nazism, according to its precursors and pioneers.

Besides Jochmann worked in teaching for many years. From 1954 to 1959 he taught at the Institute of Teacher Education from 1959 to 1963, the Academy of Sciences and from 1967 to 1984 at the History Department of the University of Hamburg. Jochmann acted as a consultant in the Hamburg Nazi trial of Ludwig Hahn, the Commander of the Security Police and Security Service in Warsaw. A wider public Jochmann was also by publishing a faithful version of Hitler Table Talk known. He has fund amental contributions to the spread of anti-Semitism (to 1945) submitted between 1871 and 1945 and the history of National Socialism in Hamburg, Germany, and the political role of Protestants during this time.

Jochmann worked according to the maxim "memory freed and is the basis of reconciliation," according to the news magazine Der Spiegel. He was willing "to get different answers, than expected or even desired."

== Selected bibliography ==
- (Ed.) Monologues at Hitler's headquarters from 1941 to 1944. Recorded by Henry Home. Hamburg 1980, ISBN 3-8135-0796-3 (special edition, Munich 2000, ISBN 3-572-01156-6).
- Social crisis and hostility towards Jews in Germany from 1870 to 1945. Hamburg 1988, ISBN 3-7672-1056-8 (Hamburger contributions to social and contemporary history, Volume 23).
- In the struggle for power. Hitler's speech to the Hamburg National Club of 1919. Frankfurt am Main, 1960 (Publications of the Research Centre for the History of National Socialism in Hamburg, Band 1).
- National Socialism and Revolution. Origin and History of the Nazi Party in Hamburg from 1922 to 1933. Documents. Frankfurt am Main, 1963 (Publications of the Research Centre for the History of National Socialism in Hamburg, Volume 3).

== Literature ==
- Büttner, Ursula (1986). "Werner Jochmann's work as director of the Research Centre for the History of National Socialism." In The unjust regime: International research on National Socialism. Vol. 1, Hamburg: pp. XV-XXVII. ISBN 3-7672-0962-4.
- Büttner, Ursula (2001). "Werner Jochmann." In Hamburgische Biography. Vol 1. Franklin Kopitzsch and Dirk Brietzke, eds. Hamburg: Wallstein Verlag. pp. 150–151. ISBN 3-7672-1364-8.
- Büttner, Ursula (2004). Werner Jochmann. A review of the tenth anniversary. Contemporary History in Hamburg 2: 11-13..
- Schüler-Springorum, Stefanie (2004). Werner Jochmann and the German-Jewish history. Contemporary History in Hamburg, Vol 2, pp. 14–20.

== Links ==
- Literature from and about Werner Jochmann in the catalog of the German National Library
- Karl-Heinz Janßen: Werner Jochmann. In: The time, August 8 1986th
- On the death of Werner Jochmann. Ethos of a historian. Time 25 November 25, 1994
