= Christian Bäumler =

German physician

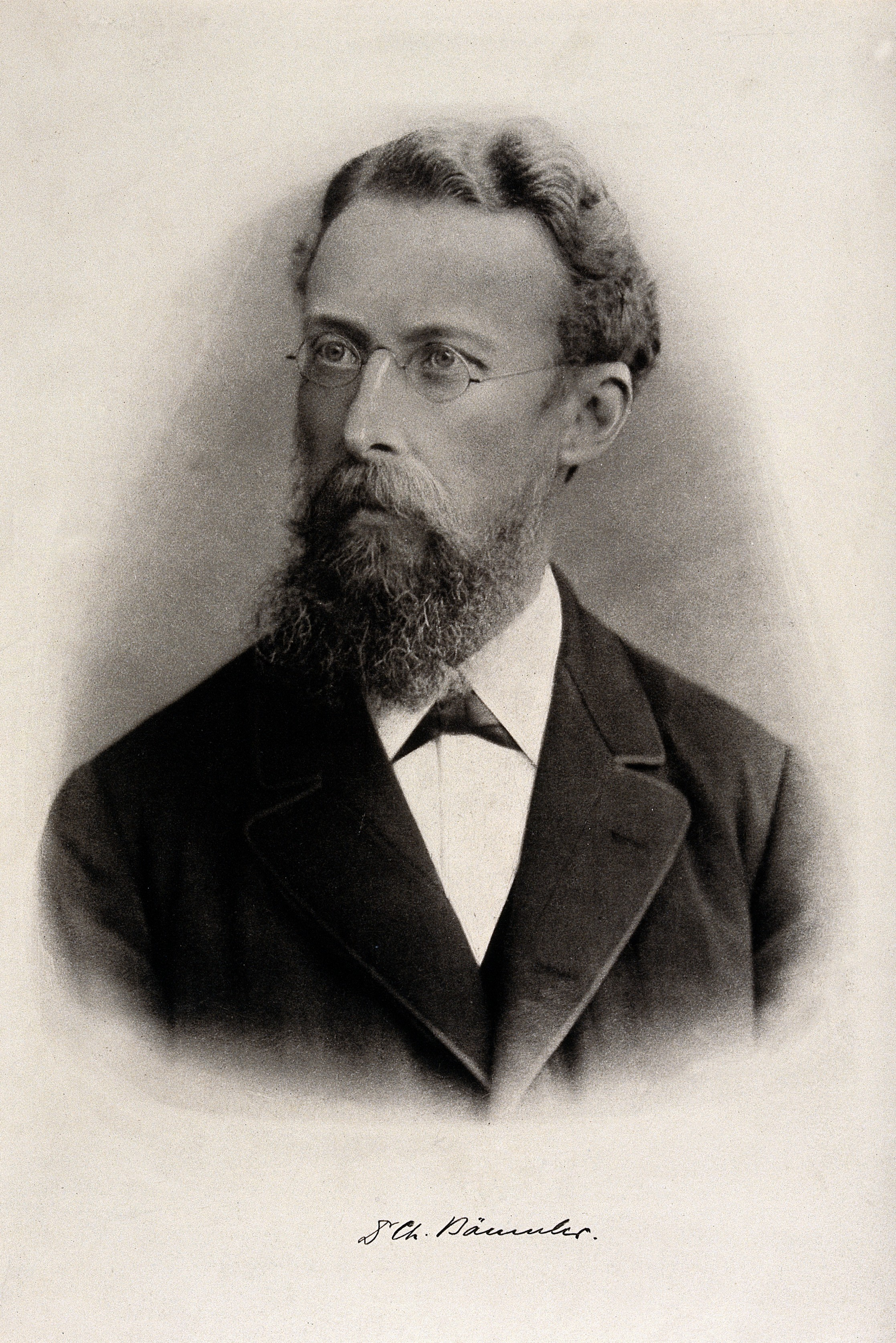
Christian Bäumler

Christian Gottfried Heinrich Bäumler (13 May 1836 in Buchau, Upper Franconia - 1933) was a German physician known for work involving infectious diseases.

== Background ==
Bäumler studied medicine at several universities, earning his doctorate at the University of Erlangen in 1860. From 1863 to 1866 he was resident medical officer at the "German Hospital" in London, and from 1866 to 1872 was an assistant physician at the German Hospital and at the Victoria Park Hospital for Diseases of the Chest. In 1866 he became a member of the Royal College of Physicians, London. After his return to Germany, he served as a professor at Erlangen and later at the University of Freiburg.

== Publications ==
In 1870 Bäumler published an English translation of Felix von Niemeyer's Klinische Vorträge über die Lungenschwindsucht as "Clinical lectures on pulmonary consumption". Other noted works by Bäumler include:

- Handbuch der chronischen Infectionskrankheiten, 1874 - Handbook on chronic infectious diseases.
- Syphilis, 1886
- Ueber die Influenza von 1889 und 1890, 1890 - On the influenza of 1889 and 1890.
- Die Entwickelung der Medizin, einst und jetzt, 1902 - The development of medicine, then and now.
