= Jach =

Jach is a surname of Polish and Czech origin. Notable people with the surname include:

- Antoni Jach (born 1956), Australian novelist, painter and playwright
- Jarosław Jach (born 1994), Polish footballer
- Michał Jach (born 1951), Polish politician
