= Baumer =

Baumer is a surname. Notable people with the surname include:

- Christoph Baumer (born 1952), Swiss scholar and explorer
- Daniela Baumer (born 1971), Swiss sprint canoer
- Jim Baumer (1931–1996), American infielder and front office executive
- Lewis Baumer (1870–1963), English caricaturist
- Susie Baumer (born 1966), Australian swimmer
- Thomas Baumer (born 1960), Swiss economist, interculturalist and personality assessor
- Uwe Schulten-Baumer (1926–2014), German show jumping and dressage rider
- William Henry Baumer Jr. (1909–1989) American army major general, military strategist, and author

== See also ==
- Baumer (band)
- Bäumer
