= Takahashi Taxol total synthesis =

Takahashi Taxol total synthesis

The Takahashi Taxol total synthesis published by Takashi Takahashi in 2006 is one of several methods in taxol total synthesis. The method starts from geraniol and differs from the other 6 published methods that it is a formal synthesis (the final product is baccatin III which lacks the amide tail found in taxol itself) and that it is racemic (the product baccatin III is optically inactive). A key feature of the published procedure is that several synthetic steps (construction of rings A, B and C) were performed in an automated synthesizer on a scale up to 300 gram and that purification steps were also automated.

== A ring synthesis ==
Ring A was synthesised starting from geraniol 1 and involved acylation (acetic anhydride, DMAP, Et_{3}N) to 2, epoxidation (N-bromosuccinimide, tBuOH/H_{2}O then triethylamine) to 3, radical cyclisation (titanocene dichloride, manganese, triethylborane, 2,6-lutidine) to 4, alcohol protection (ethyl vinyl ether, camphorsulfonic acid) to 5, alcohol deprotection (NaOH, MeOH/THF/H_{2}O) to alcohol 6, Parikh-Doering oxidation to aldehyde 7, isomerization (DBU) to enone 8, organic reduction (sodium borohydride) to alcohol 9, alcohol protection (TBSCl, Et_{3}N) to TBS ether 10, hydrazone formation (H_{2}NNHTs) to 11 and finally vinyl bromide formation (tBuLi, 1,2-Dibromoethane) in 12.

Taxol total synthesis Takahasi part1

Scheme 1. A ring synthesis

== Ring C synthesis ==
The synthesis of ring C also required hydroxygeranyl acetate 2. Subsequent steps were allylic oxidation (SeO_{2}, tBuO_{2}H, salicylic acid) to aldehyde 13, then carbonyl reduction (NaBH_{4}) to alcohol 14, then epoxidation (VO(acac)_{2}, tBuO_{2}H) to 15, then alcohol protection (MPM trichloroacetimidate) to MPM ether 16, then radical cyclisation (titanocene dichloride, manganese, triethylborane, TMSCl, K_{2}CO_{3}) to alcohol 17, alcohol protection (BOMCl, DIPEA) to benzyloxymethyl ether 18, acetate hydrolysis (NaOH) and Ley oxidation to aldehyde 19.

Taxol total synthesis Takahasi part 2

Scheme 2. C ring synthesis

== Ring B synthesis ==
Ring A (12) and ring C (19) reacted together to alcohol 20 in a Shapiro reaction (tBuLi, CeCl_{3}) in a similar way as in the Nicolaou Taxol total synthesis. Subsequent steps were epoxidation (VO(acac)_{2}, tBuO_{2}H) to 21, reduction (LiAlH_{4}) to the diol and alcohol protection (aqueous KOH, BnBr, Bu_{4}NHSO_{4}) to benzyl ether 22, alcohol protection (Me_{2}SiHCl, imidazole) and oxidation (DDQ) to DMS ether 23, tosylation (TsCl, DMAP) to 24, deprotection to diol (TBAF) and reprotection (TMSOTf, 2,6-lutidine, DIPEA) as TMS ether 25, Ley oxidation to aldehyde 26, cyanohydrin formation (TMSCN, 18-crown-6, KCN) and alcohol protection (ethyl vinyl ether, camphorsulfonic acid) to EE ether 27.

Taxol total synthesis Takahasi part 3

Scheme 3. B ring synthesis

== Ring D synthesis ==
Cyclisation of 27 took place by alkylation (LiN(TMS)_{2}, dioxane, microwave irradiation) to tricycle 28. Subsequent steps were cyanohydrin hydrolysis (camphorsulfonic acid), TMS deprotection (KOH) and allylic oxidation (SeO_{2}, tBuO_{2}H, salicylic acid) to ketone 29, then Upjohn dihydroxylation to triol 30, then acylation (AcCl, DMAP) and mesitylation (MsCl, DMAP) to 31, then benzyl group and benzyloxy group removal (hydrogenation / Palladium on carbon) followed by carbonate protection (triphosgene, pyridine) to 32, then secondary alcohol protection (TESCl, pyridine) and primary alcohol deprotection (potassium carbonate) to diol 33, then oxetane formation (DIPEA, HMPA) to 34, then acylation (Ac_{2}O, DMAP), then benzoylation (phenyllithium) to 35, then oxidation (tBuOK, (PhSeO)_{2}O, THF) to the acyloin 36, then isomerisation (tBuOK) and acylation (Ac_{2}O, DMAP, pyr) to 37, then oxidation at the allylic position (PCC, celite, NaOAc, benzene), ketone group oxidation (NaBH_{4}) and TES protecting group removal (HF·pyr) to baccatin III (38).

Taxol total synthesis Takahasi part 4

Scheme 4. D ring synthesis
