= Samuel J. Danishefsky =

American chemist

- Born: March 10, 1936 (age 90)
- Education: Yeshiva University, Harvard University
- Known for: Danishefsky's diene, Danishefsky Taxol total synthesis
- Awards: Ernest Guenther Award (1981); Wolf Prize in Chemistry (1995/6); William H. Nichols Medal (1999)
- Scientific career
- Workplaces: University of Pittsburgh, Yale University, Columbia University
- Doctoral advisor: Peter Yates

Samuel Joseph Danishefsky (born March 10, 1936) is an American chemist working as a professor at both Columbia University and the Memorial Sloan-Kettering Cancer Center in New York City.

== Birth and education ==
Samuel J. Danishefsky was born in 1936 in the United States. He completed his B.S. from Yeshiva University in 1956. He earned his Ph.D. in chemistry from Harvard University in 1962 with Peter Yates, which partially overlapped with a National Institutes of Health postdoctoral fellowship in the laboratory of Gilbert Stork at Columbia University.

== Academic career ==
After completing his PhD, he became professor at the University of Pittsburgh, where he eventually attained the rank of University Professor and taught until 1979. From 1979 to 1993, he was a professor at Yale University, where he rose to the rank of Sterling Professor of Chemistry. By 1991 he was sharing his time with Memorial Sloan-Kettering Cancer Center as director of the Laboratory for Cancer Research Bioorganic Chemistry, becoming chair in 1993. He accepted an appointment as professor at Columbia University in 1993, and now splits his time between Columbia and Sloan-Kettering.

== Research ==
Danishefsky Taxol total synthesis overview from raw material perspective

Samuel J. Danishefsky is known for his role in synthesizing many complex organic compounds, many of which are related to pharmaceuticals. Among the molecules synthesized by Danishefsky at Columbia University are epothilones and calicheamicin, which are natural products with promise as anti-cancer agents.

The Danishefsky Taxol total synthesis was the third synthesis of taxol, a highly topical natural product. Together with the Holton Taxol total synthesis and the Nicolaou Taxol total synthesis, these multistep sequences illustrate the state of the art in total synthesis.

== Awards and honors ==
In 1995/96 he shared the Wolf Prize in Chemistry with Gilbert Stork of Columbia University for "designing and developing novel chemical reactions which have opened new avenues to the synthesis of complex molecules, particularly polysaccharides and many other biologically and medicinally important compounds".

He is the recipient of several other awards including the American Chemical Society's Guenther Award and Aldrich Award for Creative Work in Synthetic Organic Chemistry, the F.A. Cotton Medal for Excellence in Chemical Research of the American Chemical Society, the Tetrahedron Prize (1996), the Arthur C. Cope Award (1998), the New York City Mayor's Award for Science and Technology, and the Bristol Myers Squibb Lifetime Achievement Award. In 2006, he was awarded the Benjamin Franklin Medal in Chemistry for his achievements in synthetic organic chemistry, particularly for the development of methods for preparing complex substances found in nature, and their emerging applications in the field of cancer treatment. He is a member of the Board of Scientific Governors at The Scripps Research Institute. He holds an honorary doctorate from Yeshiva University.

== See also ==
- Danishefsky Taxol total synthesis
- Pancratistatin
