= Tert-Butyldiphenylsilyl =

Protecting group for alcohols

tert-Butyldiphenylsilyl protecting group attached to an alcohol.

tert-Butyldiphenylsilyl, also known as TBDPS, is a protecting group for alcohols. Its formula is C_{16}H_{19}Si-.

== Development ==
The tert-butyldiphenylsilyl group was first suggested as a protecting group by Hanessian and Lavallée in 1975. It was designed to supersede the use of Corey's tert-butyldimethylsilyl as a protecting group for alcohols:

In addition to retaining all the known features that are associated with silyl ethers, such as their ease and selectivity of formation, their adaptability to various analytical techniques, and their compatibility with a variety of conditions or synthetic transformations in organic chemistry, the [TBDPS] group offers some unique and novel features that constitute a significant improvement over the existing related groups, and warrants their communication at this time.

— S. Hanessian & P. Lavallée, Can. J. Chem., 53, 19, 2975-2977, 1975

The novel features that they highlight are the increased resistance to acidic hydrolysis and increased selectivity towards protection of primary hydroxyl groups. The group is unaffected by treatment with 80% acetic acid, which catalyses the deprotection of O-tetrapyranyl, O-trityl and O-tert-butyldimethylsilyl ethers. It is also unaffected by 50% trifluoroacetic acid (TFA), and survives the harsh acidic conditions used to install and remove isopropylidene or benzylidene acetals.

== Applications in chemical synthesis ==
The TBDPS group is prized for its increased stability towards acidic conditions and nucleophilic species over the other silyl ether protecting groups. This can be thought of as arising from the extra steric bulk of the groups surrounding the silicon atom. The protecting group is easily introduced by using the latent nucleophilicity of the hydroxyl group and an electrophilic source of TBDPS. This might involve using the triflate or the less reactive chloride of TBDPS along with a mild base such as 2,6-lutidine or pyridine and potentially a catalyst such as DMAP or imidazole.

The ease of installation of the protecting group follows the order: 1^{o} > 2^{o} > 3^{o}, allowing the least hindered hydroxyl group to be protected in the presence of more hindered hydroxyls.

Protection of equatorial hydroxyl groups can be achieved over axial hydroxyl groups by the use of a cationic silyl species generated by tert-butyldiphenylsilyl chloride and a halogen abstractor, silver nitrate.

The increased stability towards acidic hydrolysis and nucleophilic species allows for the TBDPS groups in a substrate to be retained while other silyl ethers are removed. The TMS group may easily be removed in the presence of a TBDPS group by reaction with TsOH. The group is even more resistant to acid hydrolysis than the bulky TIPS. However, in the presence of a fluoride source such as TBAF or TAS-F, TIPS groups are more stable than TBDPS groups. The TBDPS group is of similar stability to the TBDMS group and is more stable in the presence of fluoride than all other simple alkyl silyl ethers. It is possible to remove the TBDPS group selectively, leaving a TBDMS group intact, using NaH in HMPA at 0 °C for five minutes.

== Stability ==
The TBDPS group is stable under a wide variety of conditions:

Condition	Stability
Aqueous Acid	Yes (Other than strong acids with long reaction times/elevated temperature)
Aqueous Base	Yes (Other than strong bases with long reaction times/elevated temperature)
Reducing	Yes (Pd/H_{2},Na/NH_{3}), Zn/HCl: No (strong acid)
Oxidative	Yes
Nucleophile	Yes (exception of F^{−})
Electrophile	Yes
Radical	Yes
Carbene	Yes
