= Trimethylsilyl trifluoromethanesulfonate =

Names
- Preferred IUPAC name Trimethylsilyl trifluoromethanesulfonate
- Other names TMSOTf; Trimethylsilyl triflate TMS triflate Trifluoromethanesulfonic acid trimethylsilyl ester

Identifiers
CAS Number	27607-77-8
3D model (JSmol)	Interactive image
ChemSpider	58839
ECHA InfoCard	100.044.136
EC Number	248-565-4
PubChem CID	65367
UNII	Z84V0CBH9J
CompTox Dashboard (EPA)	DTXSID2067325
- InChI: InChI=1S/C4H9F3O3SSi/c1-12(2,3)10-11(8,9)4(5,6)7/h1-3H3 Key: FTVLMFQEYACZNP-UHFFFAOYSA-N
- SMILES: C[Si](C)(C)OS(=O)(=O)C(F)(F)F

Properties
Chemical formula	C_{4}H_{9}F_{3}O_{3}SSi
Molar mass	222.25 g·mol^{−1}
Appearance	Colorless liquid
Density	1.225 g/mL
Boiling point	140 °C (284 °F; 413 K)

Hazards
- GHS labelling
Pictograms	(GHS02: Flammable) (GHS05: Corrosive)
Signal word	Danger
Hazard statements	H226, H314
Precautionary statements	P210, P233, P240, P241, P242, P243, P260, P264, P280, P301+P330+P331, P302+P361+P354, P303+P361+P353, P304+P340, P305+P354+P338, P316, P321, P363, P370+P378, P403+P235, P405, P501
- Except where otherwise noted, data are given for materials in their standard state (at 25 °C [77 °F], 100 kPa). Infobox references

Trimethylsilyl trifluoromethanesulfonate (TMSOTf) is an organosilicon compound with the formula (CH_{3})_{3}SiO_{3}SCF_{3}. It is a colorless moisture-sensitive liquid. It is the trifluoromethanesulfonate derivative of trimethylsilyl. It is mainly used to activate ketones and aldehydes in organic synthesis.

== Reactions ==
TMSOTf is quite sensitive toward hydrolysis:

(CH_{3})_{3}SiO_{3}SCF_{3} + H_{2}O → (CH_{3})_{3}SiOH + HO_{3}SCF_{3}

It is far more electrophilic than trimethylsilyl chloride.

Related to its tendency to hydrolyze, TMSOTf is effective for silylation of alcohols:

(CH_{3})_{3}SiO_{3}SCF_{3} + ROH + Et_{3}N → ROSi(CH_{3})_{3} + [Et_{3}NH]O_{3}SCF_{3}

A common use of (CH_{3})_{3}SiO_{3}SCF_{3} is for the preparation of silyl enol ethers. One example involves the synthesis of the silyl enol ether of camphor:

It was also used in Takahashi Taxol total synthesis and in chemical glycosylation reactions.

Trimethylsilyl trifluoromethanesulfonate has a variety of other specialized uses. It has been used to install tert-alkyl groups on phosphine (R = alkyl):

PH_{3} + R_{3}C–OAc + Me_{3}SiOTf → [(R_{3}C)_{2}PH_{2}]OTf

Deprotection of Boc-protected amines can be achieved using trimethylsilyl trifluoromethanesulfonate and triethylamine or 2,6-lutidine.

TMSOTf is also a useful reagent to replace metal-halogen bonds with a covalent M-O(SO_{2}CF_{3}) bond, the by-product being the highly volatile TMSCl which is easily removed.
