= Diethylaluminium cyanide =

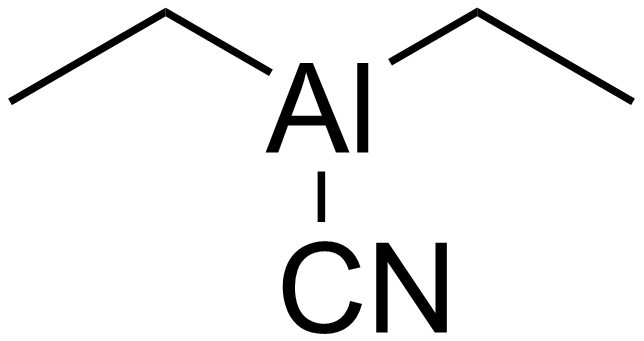

Names
- IUPAC name diethylalumanylformonitrile
- Other names: Cyanodiethyl aluminium; (Cyano-κC)diethyl-aluminium; (Cyano-C)diethyl-aluminium; Cyanodiethyl-(7CI,8CI) aluminium; Cyanodiethylallane; Cyanodiethylaluminium; Diethylaluminium Cyanide

Identifiers
CAS Number	5804-85-3
3D model (JSmol)	Interactive image
ChemSpider	10491962
ECHA InfoCard	100.024.873
EC Number	227-359-8
PubChem CID	16683962
CompTox Dashboard (EPA)	DTXSID301046472
- InChI: InChI=1S/2C2H5.CN.Al/c3*1-2;/h2*1H2,2H3;; Key: KWMUAEYVIFJZEB-UHFFFAOYSA-N
- SMILES: CC[Al](CC)C#N

Properties
Chemical formula	(CH_{3}CH_{2})_{2}AlCN
Molar mass	111.124 g·mol^{−1}
Appearance	Dark brown, clear liquid (1.0 mol/L in toluene)
Density	0.864 g/cm^{3} at (25 °C) (liquid)
Boiling point	162 °C (324 °F; 435 K) at 0.02 mmHg
Solubility in water	Reacts with water
Solubility	Benzene, Toluene, diisopropyl ether

Hazards
- GHS labelling
Pictograms	(GHS06: Toxic) (GHS09: Environmental hazard)
Signal word	Danger
Hazard statements	H300, H310, H330, H400
Precautionary statements	P260, P262, P264, P270, P271, P273, P280, P284, P301+P316, P302+P352, P304+P340, P316, P320, P321, P330, P361+P364, P391, P403+P233, P405, P501
Flash point	7 °C (45 °F; 280 K) closed cup
- Except where otherwise noted, data are given for materials in their standard state (at 25 °C [77 °F], 100 kPa). verify (what is ?) Infobox references

Diethylaluminium cyanide ("Nagata's reagent") is the organoaluminium compound with formula ((C_{2}H_{5})_{2}AlCN)_{n}. This colorless compound is usually handled as a solution in toluene. It is a reagent for the hydrocyanation of α,β-unsaturated ketones.

== Synthesis ==
Diethylaluminium cyanide was originally generated by treatment of triethylaluminium with a slight excess of hydrogen cyanide. The product is typically stored in ampoules because it is highly toxic. It dissolves in toluene, benzene, hexane and isopropyl ether. It undergoes hydrolysis readily and is not compatible with protic solvents.

n Et_{3}Al + n HCN → (Et_{2}AlCN)_{n} + n EtH

== Structure ==
Diethylaluminium cyanide has not been examined by X-ray crystallography, although other diorganoaluminium cyanides have been. Diorganylaluminium cyanides have the general formula (R_{2}AlCN)_{n}, and they exist as cyclic trimers (n = 3) or tetramers (n = 4). In these oligomers, one finds AlCN---Al linkages. One compound similar to diethylaluminium cyanide is bis[di(trimethylsilyl)methyl]aluminium cyanide, ((Me_{3}Si)_{2}CH)_{2}AlCN, which has been shown crystallographically to exist as a trimer with the following structure:

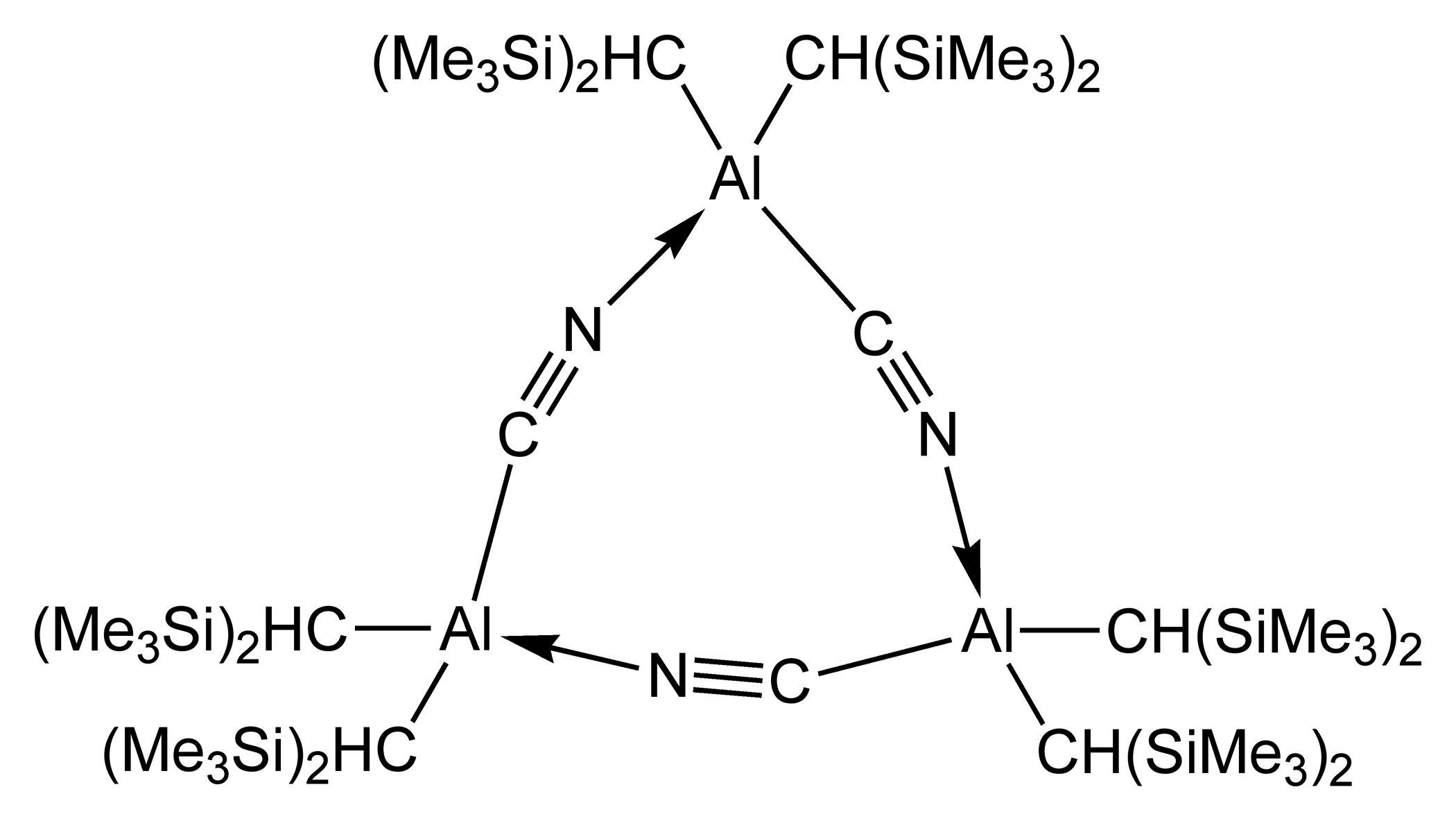

Bis(tert-butyl)aluminium cyanide, ^{t}Bu_{2}AlCN exists as a tetramer in the crystalline phase:

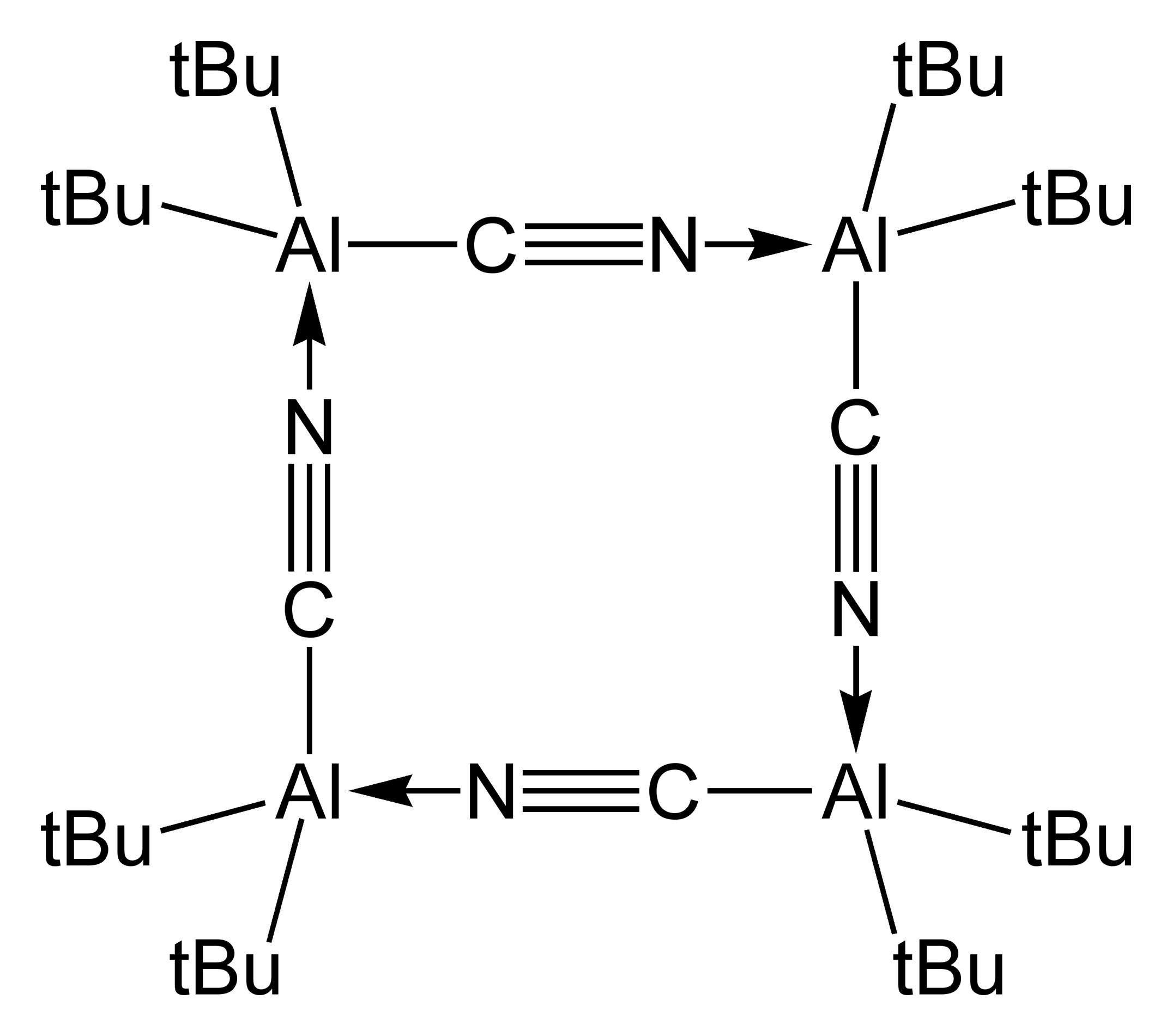

== Uses ==
Diethylaluminium cyanide is used for the stoichiometric hydrocyanation of α,β-unsaturated ketones. The reaction is influenced by the basicity of the solvent. This effect arises from the Lewis acidic qualities of the reagent. The purpose of this reaction is to generate alkylnitriles, which are precursors to amines, amides, carboxylic acids esters and aldehydes.

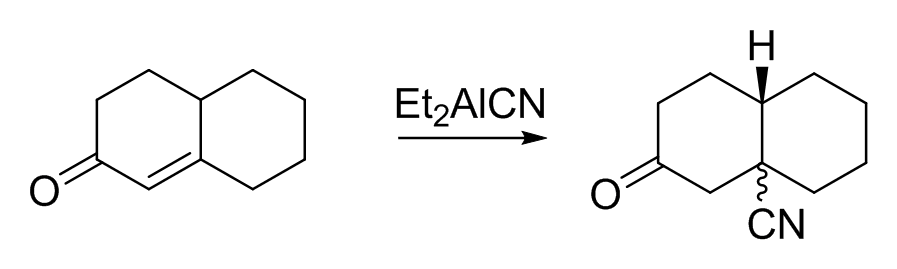
