= Paclitaxel total synthesis =

Ongoing research into paclitaxel synthesis

Molecular structure of paclitaxel.

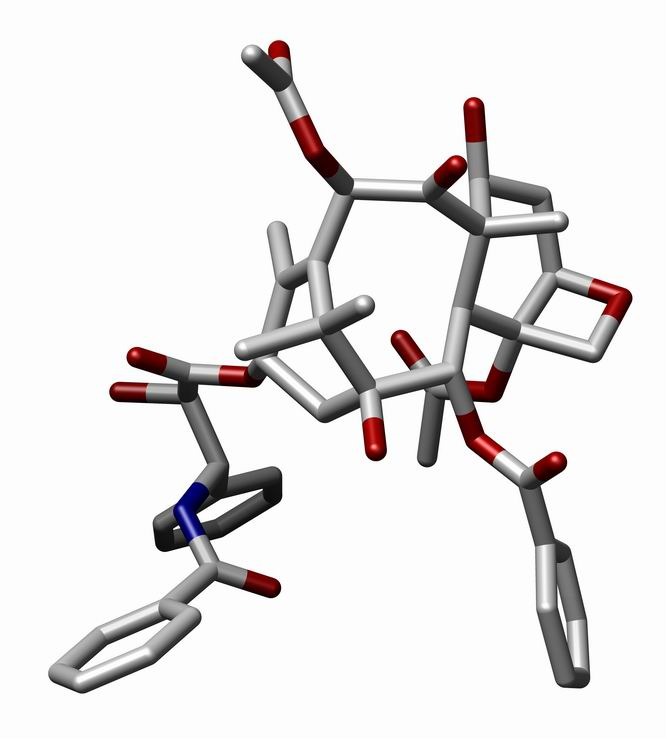
Crystal structure of paclitaxel.

Paclitaxel total synthesis in organic chemistry is a major ongoing research effort in the total synthesis of paclitaxel (Taxol). This diterpenoid is an important drug in the treatment of cancer but, also expensive because the compound is harvested from a scarce resource, namely the Pacific yew (Taxus brevifolia). Not only is the synthetic reproduction of the compound itself of great commercial and scientific importance, but it also opens the way to paclitaxel derivatives not found in nature but with greater potential.

The paclitaxel molecule consists of a tetracyclic core called baccatin III and an amide tail. The core rings are conveniently called (from left to right) ring A (a cyclohexene), ring B (a cyclooctane), ring C (a cyclohexane) and ring D (an oxetane).

The paclitaxel drug development process took over 40 years. The anti-tumor activity of a bark extract of the Pacific yew tree was discovered in 1963 as a follow-up of a US government plant screening program already in existence 20 years before that. The active substance responsible for the anti-tumor activity was discovered in 1969 and structure elucidation was completed in 1971. Robert A. Holton of Florida State University succeeded in the total synthesis of paclitaxel in 1994, a project that he had started in 1982. In 1988 Jean-Noël Denis had also developed a semisynthetic route to paclitaxel starting from 10-deacetylbaccatin III. This compound is a biosynthetic precursor and is found in larger quantities than paclitaxel itself in Taxus baccata (the European yew). In 1990 Bristol-Myers Squibb bought a licence to the patent for this process which in the years to follow earned Florida State University and Holton (with a 40% take) over 200 million US dollars.

== Total synthesis ==
Taxol numbering scheme

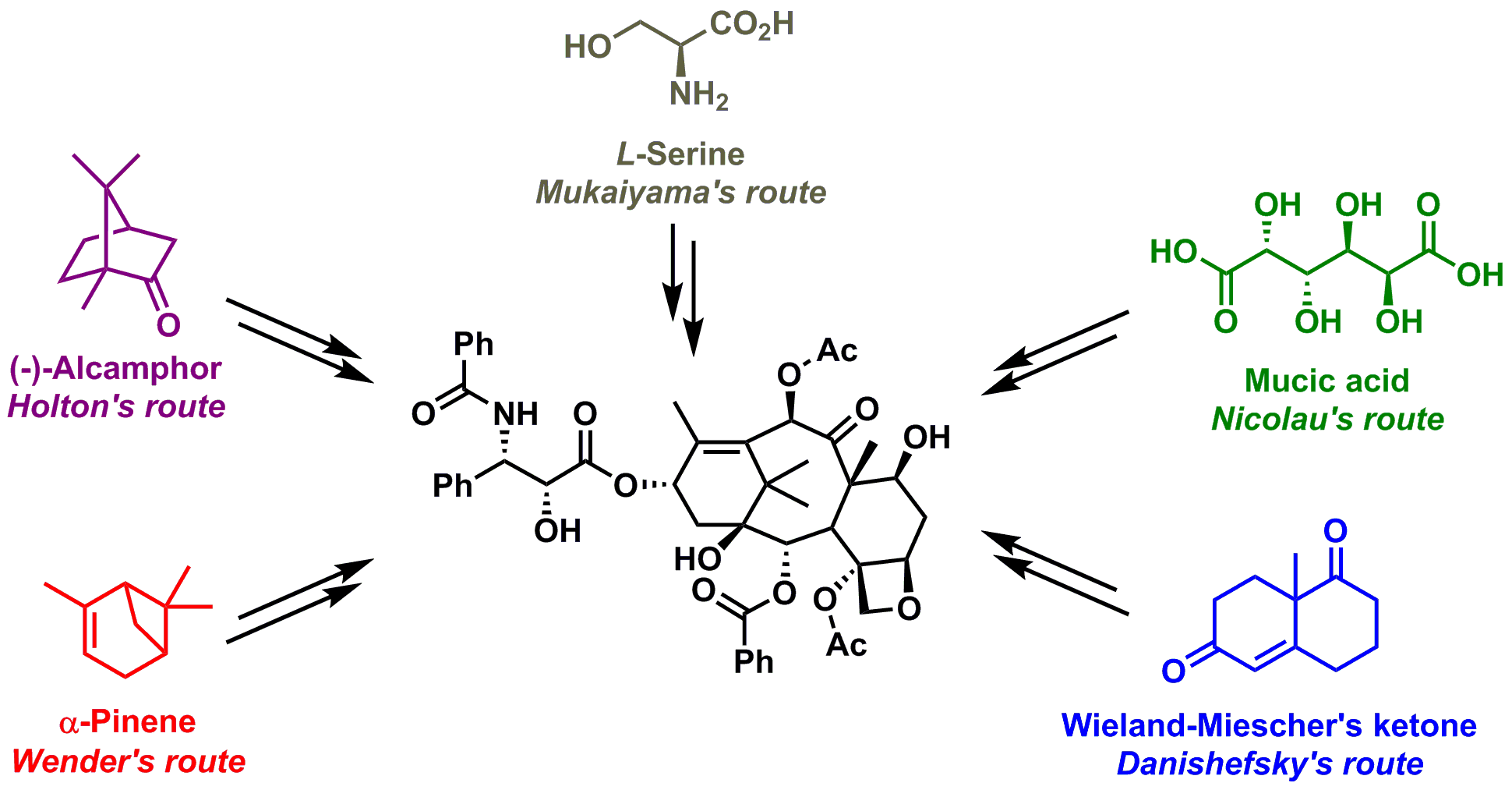
Taxol synthesis routes showing the precursors used by each of them.

The total synthesis of taxol is called one of the most hotly contested of the 1990s with around 30 competing research groups by 1992. The number of research groups actually having reported a total synthesis currently stands at 11 with the Holton group (article first accepted for publication) and the Nicolaou group (article first published) first and second in what is called a photo finish.

Some of the efforts are truly synthetic but in others a precursor molecule found in nature is included. The key data are collected below. What all strategies have in common is synthesis of the baccatin molecule followed by last stage addition of the tail, a process (except for one) based on the Ojima lactam.

1. Holton Taxol total synthesis - year: 1994 - precursor: Patchoulol strategy: linear synthesis AB then C then D - references: see related article
2. Nicolaou Taxol total synthesis - year: 1994 - precursor: Mucic acid strategy: convergent synthesis A and C merge to ABC then D - references: see related article
3. Danishefsky Taxol total synthesis - year: 1996 - precursor: Wieland-Miescher ketone strategy: convergent synthesis C merges with D then with A merges to ABCD - references: See related article
4. Wender Taxol total synthesis - year: 1997 - precursor: Pinene strategy: linear synthesis AB then C then D - references:
5. Kuwajima Taxol total synthesis I. Kuwajima, - year: 1998 - precursor: synthetic building blocks strategy: linear synthesis A then B then C then D
6. Mukaiyama Taxol total synthesis - year: 1998 - Precursor: L-serine strategy: linear synthesis B, then C, then A then D. References: see related article.
7. Takahashi Taxol total synthesis - year: 2006 - Precursor: geraniol strategy: convergent synthesis A and C merge to ABC then D
8. Sato-Chida Taxol total synthesis - year: 2015, formal synthesis to a Takahashi intermediate
9. Nakada Taxol total synthesis - year: 2015, formal synthesis to a Takahashi intermediate
10. Baran Taxol total synthesis - year: 2020, total synthesis via a two-phase divergent synthetic approach.
11. Li Taxol total synthesis - year: 2021, total synthesis via B ring closure by forming C1–C2 bond.

Ongoing research efforts are directed at the synthesis of taxadiene and taxadienone intermediates. The synthesis of related taxanes decinnamoyltaxinine E and taxabaccatin III has been reported

== Semisynthesis ==
The commercial semisynthesis (by Bristol-Myers Squibb) of paclitaxel starting from 10-deacetylbaccatin III (isolated from the European yew) is based on tail addition of the so-called Ojima lactam to its free hydroxyl group:

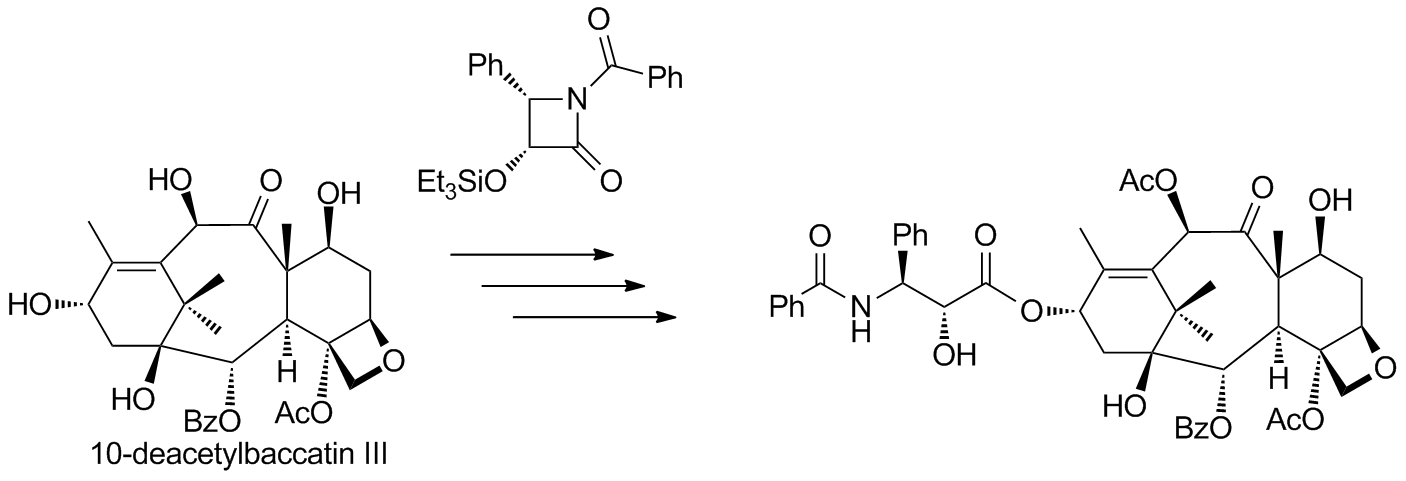
Semisynthesis of taxol from 10-deacetylbaccatin and (3R,4S)-3-triethylsilanyloxy-4-phenyl-N-Boc-2-azetidinone

Another commercial semisynthesis (by the company Natural Pharmaceuticals) relies on the isolation of a group of paclitaxel derivatives isolated from primary ornamental taxanes. These derivatives have the same skeleton as paclitaxel except for the organic residue R of the terminal tail amide group which can be phenyl, or propyl or pentyl (among others) whereas in paclitaxel it is an explicit phenyl group. The semisynthesis consists of conversion of the amide group to an amine with Schwartz's reagent through an imine followed by acidic workup and a benzoylation.

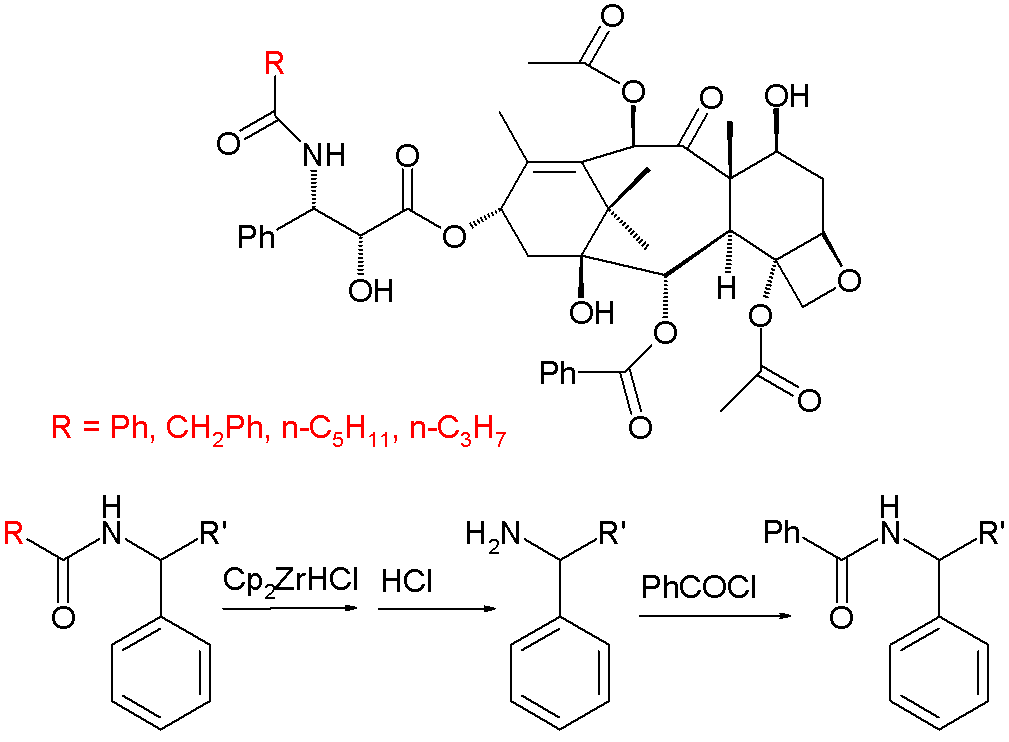

In the production process Michigan grown yews which mature in 8 years are periodically topped and dried. This material is shipped to Mexico for a first extraction step (10% paclitaxel content) and then to Canada for further purification to 95% purity. The semisynthesis to final product takes place in China.

== Biosynthesis ==

The biosynthetic pathway to paclitaxel has been investigated and consists of approximately 20 enzymatic steps. The complete scheme is still unavailable. The segments that are known are very different from the synthetic pathways tried thus far (Scheme 1). The starting compound is geranylgeranyl diphosphate 2 which is a dimer of geraniol 1. This compound already contains all the required 20 carbon atoms for the paclitaxel skeleton. More ring closing through intermediate 3 (taxadiene) leads to taxusin 4. The two main reasons why this type of synthesis is not feasible in the laboratory is that nature does a much better job controlling stereochemistry and a much better job activating a hydrocarbon skeleton with oxygen substituents for which cytochrome P450 is responsible in some of the oxygenations. Intermediate 5 is called 10-deacetylbaccatin III.

A biochemical kilogram-scale production of taxadiene was reported using genetically engineered E. coli in 2011.
