= Wieland–Miescher ketone =

Names
- Preferred IUPAC name 8a-Methyl-3,4,8,8a-tetrahydronaphthalene-1,6(2H,7H)-dione

Identifiers
CAS Number	20007-72-1
3D model (JSmol)	Interactive image
ChemSpider	80553
ECHA InfoCard	100.039.497
PubChem CID	89262
UNII	FAX7VUD577
CompTox Dashboard (EPA)	DTXSID40894783
- InChI: InChI=1S/C11H14O2/c1-11-6-5-9(12)7-8(11)3-2-4-10(11)13/h7H,2-6H2,1H3 Key: DNHDRUMZDHWHKG-UHFFFAOYSA-N; InChI=1/C11H14O2/c1-11-6-5-9(12)7-8(11)3-2-4-10(11)13/h7H,2-6H2,1H3 Key: DNHDRUMZDHWHKG-UHFFFAOYAC
- SMILES: CC12CCC(=O)C=C1CCCC2=O

Properties
Chemical formula	C_{11}H_{14}O_{2}
Molar mass	178.23 g/mol
Melting point	47 to 50 °C (117 to 122 °F; 320 to 323 K)
- Except where otherwise noted, data are given for materials in their standard state (at 25 °C [77 °F], 100 kPa). Infobox references

The Wieland–Miescher ketone is a racemic bicyclic diketone (enedione) and is a versatile synthon which has so far been employed in the total synthesis of more than 50 natural products, predominantly sesquiterpenoids, diterpenes and steroids possessing possible biological properties including anticancer, antimicrobial, antiviral, antineurodegenerative and immunomodulatory activities. The reagent is named after two chemists from Ciba Geigy, Karl Miescher and Peter Wieland (not to be confused with Heinrich Otto Wieland). Examples of syntheses performed using the optically active enantiomer of this diketone as a starting material are that of ancistrofuran and the Danishefsky total synthesis of Taxol.

Most advances in total synthesis methods starting from Wieland–Miescher ketone were fueled by the search for alternative methods for the industrial synthesis of contraceptive and other medicinally relevant steroids, an area of research that flourished in the 1960s and 1970s. Wieland–Miescher ketone contains the AB-ring structure of steroids and is for this reason an attractive starting material for the steroid skeleton, an approach used in one synthesis of adrenosterone.

The original Wieland–Miescher ketone is racemic and prepared in a Robinson annulation of 2-methyl-1,3-cyclohexanedione and methyl vinyl ketone. The intermediate alcohol is not isolated. An enantioselective synthesis employs L-proline as an organocatalyst:

This reaction was reported in 1971 by Z. G. Hajos and D. R. Parrish. In their patent, the isolation and characterization of the above pictured optically active intermediate bicyclic ketol (in parentheses) has also been described, because they worked at ambient temperature in anhydrous dimethylformamide (DMF) solvent. Working in DMSO solvent does not allow isolation of the bicyclic ketol intermediate, it leads directly to the optically active bicyclic dione. The reaction is called the Hajos-Parrish reaction or the Hajos-Parrish-Eder-Sauer-Wiechert reaction.

This reaction has also been performed in a one-pot procedure, leading to 49% yield and 76% enantiomeric excess (ee):

Other proline-based catalysts have been investigated.
