= Ojima lactam =

Chemical compound

The Ojima lactam, (3R,4S)-1-Benzoyl-4-phenyl-3-[(triethylsilyl)oxy]-2-azetidinone, (Note: The opposite enantiomer is depicted here) is an organic compound of some importance in the commercial production of Taxol. This lactam was first synthesized by Iwao Ojima. The organic synthesis is an illustration of asymmetric synthesis via a chiral auxiliary.

The reaction centers around an imine - lithium enolate cycloaddition. In order to ensure the correct stereochemistry (the phenyl group and the silyl ether must adopt a cis configuration) in the β-lactam a chiral auxiliary is used in the enolate synthesis. The enolate synthesis starts from glycolic acid. The hydroxyl group is protected by a benzyl group and the carboxylic acid is activated by reaction with thionyl chloride to the acid chloride. The acid chloride reacts with the chiral auxiliary trans-2-phenyl-1-cyclohexanol. The benzyl group is then removed and replaced by a TES silyl ether by reaction with triethylsilyl chloride. Reaction with phenyllithium affords the enolate.

Ojima lactam I

The imine synthesis is a reaction of hexamethyldisilazane with phenyllithium to a strong amide base followed by a condensation reaction with benzaldehyde.

Ojima lactam II

Both imine and enole intermediate join in a cycloaddition reaction followed by an intramolecular substitution of the amine with expulsion of the trimethylsilyl derivative of the chiral auxiliary to the cis-lactam. Finally, the benzoyl group is added in a Schotten-Baumann reaction.

Ojima lactam III
