= Tert-Butyldimethylsilyl chloride =

tert-Butyldimethylsilyl chloride
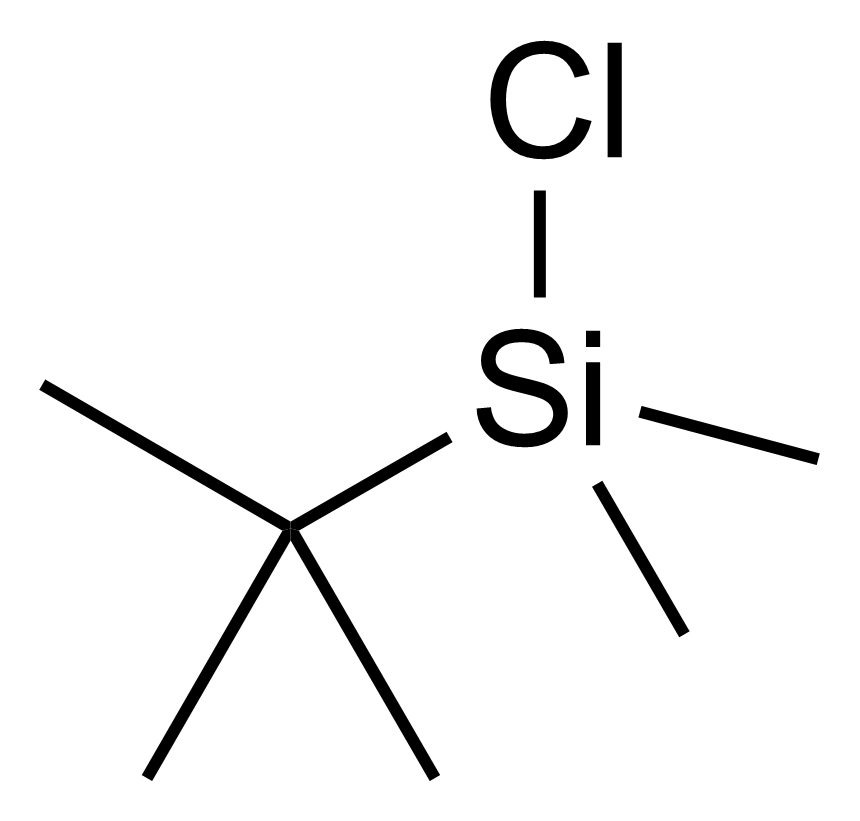

Names
- Preferred IUPAC name tert-Butyl(chloro)di(methyl)silane

Identifiers
CAS Number	18162-48-6
3D model (JSmol)	Interactive image
ChEBI	CHEBI:85071
ChemSpider	26908
ECHA InfoCard	100.038.206
EC Number	242-042-4
PubChem CID	28928
UNII	550OPF5Z9F
CompTox Dashboard (EPA)	DTXSID4038843
- InChI: InChI=1S/C6H15ClSi/c1-6(2,3)8(4,5)7/h1-5H3 Key: BCNZYOJHNLTNEZ-UHFFFAOYSA-N
- SMILES: CC(C)(C)[Si](C)(C)Cl

Properties
Chemical formula	C_{6}H_{15}ClSi
Molar mass	150.72 g·mol^{−1}
Appearance	white solid
Odor	pungent, grassy
Melting point	86–89 °C (187–192 °F; 359–362 K)

Hazards
- GHS labelling
Pictograms	(GHS02: Flammable) (GHS05: Corrosive)
Signal word	Danger
Hazard statements	H228, H314
Precautionary statements	P210, P240, P241, P260, P264, P280, P301+P330+P331, P303+P361+P353, P304+P340, P305+P351+P338, P310, P321, P363, P370+P378, P405, P501
- Except where otherwise noted, data are given for materials in their standard state (at 25 °C [77 °F], 100 kPa). Infobox references

tert-Butyldimethylsilyl chloride is an organosilicon compound with the formula (Me_{3}C)Me_{2}SiCl (Me = CH_{3}). It is commonly abbreviated as TBSCl or TBDMSCl. It is a chlorosilane containing two methyl groups and a tert-butyl group. As such it is more bulky than trimethylsilyl chloride. It is a colorless or white solid that is soluble in many organic solvents but reacts with water and alcohols. The compound is used to protect alcohols in organic synthesis.

tert-Butyldimethylsilyl chloride reacts with alcohols in the presence of base to give tert-butyldimethylsilyl ethers:

(Me_{3}C)Me_{2}SiCl + ROH → (Me_{3}C)Me_{2}SiOR + HCl

These silyl ethers hydrolyze much more slowly than the trimethylsilyl ethers.

It also can silylate terminal alkynes.

== Related reagents ==
The triflate derivative (Me_{3}C)Me_{2}SiOTf is used similarly but is more reactive.
