= Pyridinium p-toluenesulfonate =

Names
- IUPAC name 4-methylbenzenesulfonate; pyridin-1-ium
- Other names pyridinium p-toluenesulfonate, pyridinium tosylate

Identifiers
| CAS Number | 24057-28-1 |
| 3D model (JSmol) | Interactive image |
| Abbreviations | PPTS |
| ChemSpider | 141806 |
| ECHA InfoCard | 100.041.806 |
| PubChem CID | 466102 |
| CompTox Dashboard (EPA) | DTXSID5066952 |
- InChI: InChI=1S/C7H8O3S.C5H5N/c1-6-2-4-7(5-3-6)11(8,9)10;1-2-4-6-5-3-1/h2-5H,1H3,(H,8,9,10);1-5H Key: ZDYVRSLAEXCVBX-UHFFFAOYSA-N; InChI=1/C7H8O3S.C5H5N/c1-6-2-4-7(5-3-6)11(8,9)10;1-2-4-6-5-3-1/h2-5H,1H3,(H,8,9,10);1-5H Key: ZDYVRSLAEXCVBX-UHFFFAOYAE
- SMILES: CC1=CC=C(S(=O)([O-])=O)C=C1.C2=[NH+]C=CC=C2

Properties
| Chemical formula | C_{12}H_{13}NO_{3}S |
| Molar mass | 251.30 g·mol^{−1} |
| Appearance | Colourless solid |
| Melting point | 120 °C (248 °F; 393 K) |
| Acidity (pK_{a}) | 5.21 |
- Except where otherwise noted, data are given for materials in their standard state (at 25 °C [77 °F], 100 kPa). verify (what is ?) Infobox references

Pyridinium p-toluenesulfonate (PPTS) is a colourless solid salt of pyridine and p-toluenesulfonic acid.

== Uses ==
In organic synthesis, PPTS is used as a weakly acidic catalyst, providing an organic soluble source of pyridinium (C_{5}H_{5}NH^{+}) ions. For example, PPTS is used to deprotect silyl ethers or tetrahydropyranyl ethers when a substrate is unstable to stronger acid catalysts. It is also a commonly used catalyst for the preparation of acetals and ketals from aldehydes and ketones.
