= Silyl ether =

Group of chemical compounds

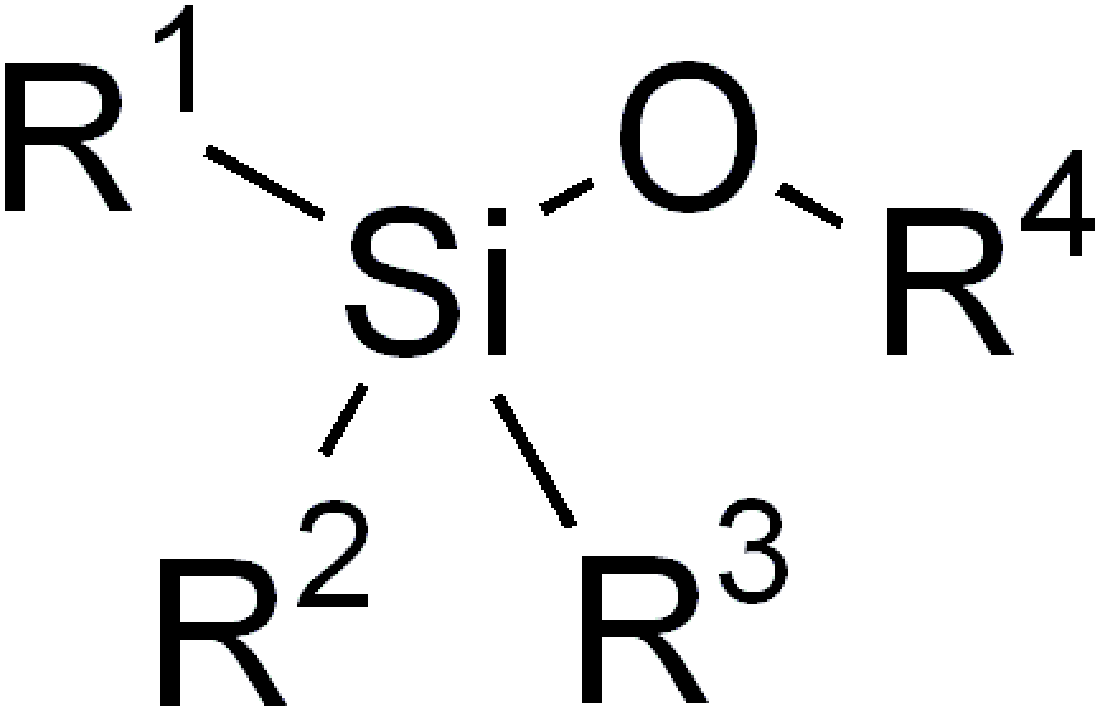
General structure of a silyl ether

Silyl ethers are a group of chemical compounds which contain a silicon atom covalently bonded to an alkoxy group. The general structure is R^{1}R^{2}R^{3}Si−O−R^{4} where R^{4} is an alkyl group or an aryl group. Silyl ethers are usually used as protecting groups for alcohols in organic synthesis. Since R^{1}R^{2}R^{3} can be combinations of differing groups which can be varied in order to provide a number of silyl ethers, this group of chemical compounds provides a wide spectrum of selectivity for protecting group chemistry. Common silyl ethers are: trimethylsilyl (TMS), tert-butyldiphenylsilyl (TBDPS), tert-butyldimethylsilyl (TBS/TBDMS) and triisopropylsilyl (TIPS). They are particularly useful because they can be installed and removed very selectively under mild conditions.

== Common silyl ethers ==
RO(TMS)	RO(TES)	RO(TBS)/RO(TBDMS)	RO(TBDPS)	RO(TIPS)
Trimethylsilyl ether	Triethylsilyl ether	tert-Butyldimethylsilyl ether	tert-Butyldiphenylsilyl ether	Triisopropylsilyl ether

== Formation ==
Commonly silylation of alcohols requires a silyl chloride and an amine base. One reliable and rapid procedure is the Corey protocol in which the alcohol is reacted with a silyl chloride and imidazole at high concentration in DMF. If DMF is replaced by dichloromethane, the reaction is somewhat slower, but the purification of the compound is simplified. A common hindered base for use with silyl triflates is 2,6-lutidine. Primary alcohols can be protected in less than one hour while some hindered alcohols may require days of reaction time.

When using a silyl chloride, no special precautions are usually required, except for the exclusion of large amounts of water. An excess of silyl chloride can be employed but is not necessary. If excess reagent is used, the product will require flash chromatography to remove excess silanol and siloxane.

Sometimes silyl triflate and a hindered amine base are used. Silyl triflates are more reactive than their corresponding chlorides, so they can be used to install silyl groups onto hindered positions. Silyl triflate is more reactive and also converts ketones to silyl enol ethers. Silyl triflates are water sensitive and must be run under inert atmosphere conditions. Purification involves the addition of an aqueous acid such as saturated ammonium chloride solution. Water quenches remaining silyl reagent and protonates amine bases prior to their removal from the reaction mixture. Following extraction, the product can be purified by flash chromatography.

Ketones react with hydrosilanes in the presence of metal catalysts.

== Removal ==
Reaction with acids or fluorides such as tetra-n-butylammonium fluoride removes the silyl group when protection is no longer needed. Larger substituents increase resistance to hydrolysis, but also make introduction of the silyl group more difficult.

In acidic media, the relative resistance is:

TMS (1) < TES (64) < TBS (20 000) < TIPS (700,000) < TBDPS (5,000,000)

In basic media, the relative resistance is:

TMS (1) < TES (10-100) < TBS~TBDPS (20 000) < TIPS (100,000)

== Monoprotection of symmetrical diols ==
It is possible to monosilylate a symmetrical diol, although this is known to be problematic occasionally. For example, the following monosilylation was reported:

However, it turns out that this reaction is hard to repeat. If the reaction were controlled solely by thermodynamics, and if the dianion is of similar reactivity to the monoanion, then a corresponding statistical mixture of 1:2:1 disilylated:monosilylated:unsilylated diol would be expected. However, the reaction in THF is made selective by two factors: 1. kinetic deprotonation of the first anion and 2. the insolubility of the monoanion. At the initial addition of TBSCl, there is only a minor amount of monoanion in solution with the rest being in suspension. This small portion reacts and shifts the equilibrium of the monoanion to draw more into solution, thereby allowing for high yields of the mono-TBS compound to be obtained. Superior results in some cases may be obtained with butyllithium:

A third method uses a mixture of DMF and DIPEA.

Alternatively, an excess (4 eq) of the diol can be used, forcing the reaction toward monoprotection.

== Selective deprotection ==
Selective deprotection of silyl groups is possible in many instances. For example, in the synthesis of taxol:

Silyl ethers are mainly differentiated on the basis of sterics or electronics. In general, acidic deprotections deprotect less hindered silyl groups faster, with the steric bulk on silicon being more significant than the steric bulk on oxygen. Fluoride-based deprotections deprotect electron-poor silyl groups faster than electron-rich silyl groups. There is some evidence that some silyl deprotections proceed via hypervalent silicon species.

The selective deprotection of silyl ethers has been extensively reviewed. Although selective deprotections have been achieved under many different conditions, some procedures, outlined below, are more reliable. A selective deprotection will likely be successful if there is a substantial difference in sterics (e.g., primary TBS vs. secondary TBS or primary TES vs primary TBS) or electronics (e.g. primary TBDPS vs. primary TBS). Unfortunately, some optimization is inevitably required and it is often necessary to run deprotections partway and recycle material.

Some common acidic conditions

- 100 mol% 10-CSA (camphorsulfonic acid) in MeOH, room temperature; a "blast" of acid, deprotects primary TBS groups within ten minutes.
- 10 mol% 10-CSA, 1:1 MeOH:DCM, −20 or 0 °C; deprotects a primary TBS group within two hours at 0; if CSA is replaced by PPTS, the rate is approximately ten times slower; with p-TsOH, approximately ten times faster; solvent mixture is crucial.
- 4:1:1 v/v/v AcOH:THF:water, room temp.; this is very slow, but can be very selective.

Some common basic conditions

- HF-pyridine, 10:1 THF:pyridine, 0 °C; an excellent deprotection; removes primary TBS groups within eight hours; reactions using HF must be run in plastic containers.
- TBAF, THF or 1:1 TBAF/AcOH, THF; TBDPS and TBS groups can be deprotected in the presence of one another under different conditions.
