= Biphosphate =

A biphosphate is any of the following (due to fluctuations in chemical nomenclature over the centuries):

- One of the two phosphate ions which can be singular to 1 metal ion
  - Monohydrogen phosphate, commonly known as hydrogenphosphate, also known as biphosphate(2-) ([HPO_{4}]^{2-}).
  - Dihydrogen phosphate, also known as biphosphate(1-) ([H_{2}PO_{4}]^{−}).
- Any salt of phosphoric acid in which only one of the hydrogen atoms has been replaced by a metal ion
  - Calcium biphosphate is monocalcium phosphate
  - Potassium biphosphate is monopotassium phosphate
  - Magnesium biphosphate is monomagnesium phosphate
  - Sodium biphosphate is monosodium phosphate
- Any diphosphate, which may be:
  - Any pyrophosphate
    - Any simple pyrophosphate salt (which have no hydrogen atoms)
      - Calcium pyrophosphate
      - Tetrasodium pyrophosphate
      - Zinc pyrophosphate
    - Any organic pyrophosphate or any organic molecule with two phosphate groups
      - Adenosine diphosphate
        - Deoxyadenosine diphosphate
      - Cytidine diphosphate
        - Deoxycytidine diphosphate
      - Guanosine diphosphate
        - Deoxyguanosine diphosphate
      - Thiamine pyrophosphate
      - Thymidine diphosphate
      - Uridine diphosphate
  - Any salt or ester with two phosphate groups
    - Hexestrol diphosphate
