= S,S'-Dimethyl dithiocarbonate =

Chemical compound

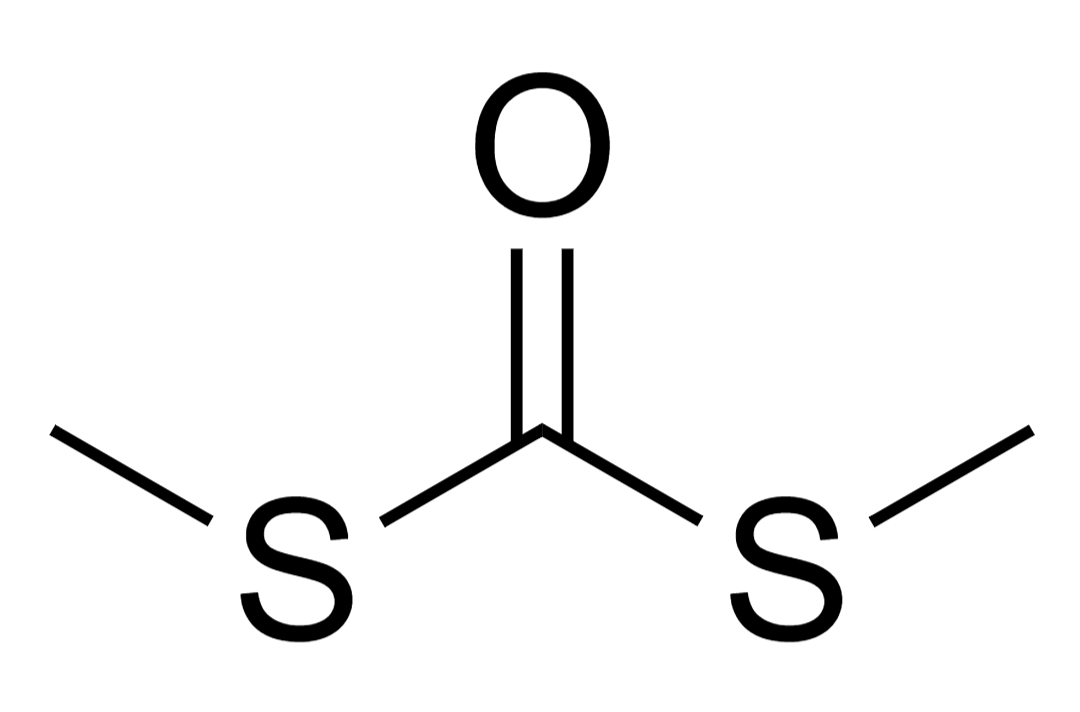

Names
- IUPAC name S,S'-Dimethyl dithiocarbonate
- Systematic IUPAC name S,S-Dimethyl carbonodithioate
- Other names: Bis(methylsulfanyl)methanone; Carbonodithioic acid S,S-dimethyl ester; Dithiocarbonic acid S,S'-dimethyl ester; S,S-Dimethyl dithiocarbonate

Identifiers
CAS Number	868-84-8
3D model (JSmol)	Interactive image
Beilstein Reference	1421112
ChEMBL	ChEMBL4796378
ChemSpider	277261
ECHA InfoCard	100.106.322
EC Number	617-931-9
PubChem CID	313474
UNII	3VA2L63KTH
CompTox Dashboard (EPA)	DTXSID20310491
- InChI: InChI=1S/C3H6OS2/c1-5-3(4)6-2/h1-2H3 Key: IUXMJLLWUTWQFX-UHFFFAOYSA-N
- SMILES: CSC(=O)SC

Properties
Chemical formula	OC(SCH_{3})_{2}
Molar mass	122.20 g·mol^{−1}
Appearance	Colorless liquid
Density	1.1705 g/cm^{3}
Boiling point	169 °C (336 °F; 442 K)
Refractive index (n_{D})	1.5485

Hazards
- GHS labelling
Pictograms	(GHS07: Exclamation mark)
Signal word	Warning
Hazard statements	H227, H302
Precautionary statements	P210, P264, P270, P280, P301+P312+P330, P301+P317, P330, P370+P378, P403+P235, P501
Flash point	62 °C (144 °F)

Related compounds
Related compounds	Dimethyl carbonate; Dimethyl trithiocarbonate
- Except where otherwise noted, data are given for materials in their standard state (at 25 °C [77 °F], 100 kPa). Infobox references

S,S'-Dimethyl dithiocarbonate is an organic compound with the chemical formula O=C(SCH_{3})_{2}. It is a colorless liquid. It is a methyl ester of dithiocarbonic S,S-acid (O=C(SH)_{2}). It is a thioester (the prefix thio- means that an oxygen atom in the compound is replaced by a sulfur atom). It is an analog of dimethyl carbonate (O=C(OCH_{3})_{2}), where the two oxygen atoms from the −OCH_{3} groups are replaced by sulfur atoms. In terms of the name of this thioester, it is derived from an esterification of dithiocarbonic S,S-acid with methanethiol.

== Uses ==
S,S'-Dimethyl dithiocarbonate is used as a dehydrating agent in chemistry and as a carbonylating agent. It can be used as a source of a methanethiolate (CH_{3}S^{−}).

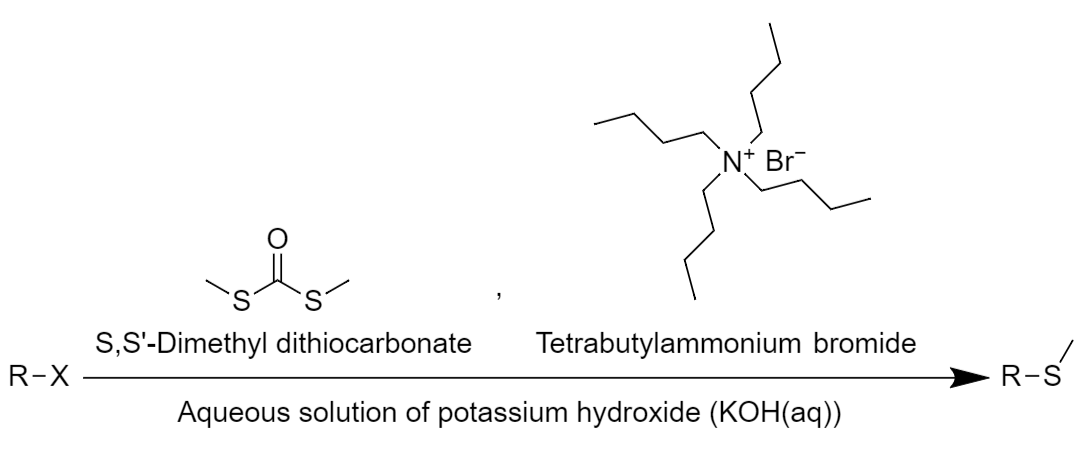
Alkanethiolation reaction using S,S'-dimethyl dithiocarbonate, tetrabutylammonium bromide and aqueous solution of potassium hydroxide

== Hazards and toxicity ==
S,S′-Dimethyl dithiocarbonate is a skin, eye, and respiratory system irritant; it can be absorbed into the body through the skin, causing damage to the body. It may cause damage to gastrointestinal system if it is swallowed. S,S′-Dimethyl dithiocarbonate is combustible. Upon catching fire, irritating and toxic fumes and gases, such as carbon monoxide (CO), carbon dioxide (CO_{2}), and sulfur dioxide (SO_{2}), are released. It may react violently with strong oxidizing agents.
