= (deoxy)adenylate kinase =

Class of enzymes

(Deoxy)adenylate kinase

Identifiers
- EC no.: 2.7.4.11
- CAS no.: 37278-19-6

Databases
- IntEnz: IntEnz view
- BRENDA: BRENDA entry
- ExPASy: NiceZyme view
- KEGG: KEGG entry
- MetaCyc: metabolic pathway
- PRIAM: profile
- PDB structures: RCSB PDB PDBe PDBsum
- Gene Ontology: AmiGO / QuickGO
Search
- PMC: articles
- PubMed: articles
- NCBI: proteins

(Deoxy)adenylate kinase (EC 2.7.4.11) is an enzyme that catalyzes the chemical reaction

deoxyadenosine monophosphate
ATP
ADP
ATP
ADP
deoxyadenosine diphosphate

The enzyme characterised from L cells converts the nucleotide, deoxyadenosine monophosphate, to deoxyadenosine diphosphate by transferring a phosphate group from the cofactor, adenosine triphosphate (ATP), which is converted to adenosine diphosphate (ADP).

This enzyme belongs to the family of transferases, specifically those transferring phosphorus-containing groups (phosphotransferases) with a phosphate group as acceptor. The systematic name of this enzyme class is ATP:(d)AMP phosphotransferase.
