= C3H6OS2 =

The molecular formula C_{3}H_{6}OS_{2} may refer to:

- S,S'-Dimethyl dithiocarbonate
- Ethyl xanthic acid
- Thiomethylketone
- 1,2-dithiolane-1-oxide
- 1,3-dithiolane-1-oxide
