= Thiocarbonate =

Derivatives of the carbonate ion

Thiocarbonates are a family of anions with the general chemical formula CS_{3−x}O^{2−}_{x} (x = 0, 1, or 2):

- for x = 2 it is monothiocarbonate ion CO_{2}S^{2−}
- for x = 1 it is dithiocarbonate ion COS^{2−}_{2}
- for x = 0 it is trithiocarbonate ion CS^{2−}_{3}

Like the carbonate dianion, the thiocarbonate ions are trigonal planar, with carbon atom at the center of triangle, and oxygen and sulfur atoms at the peaks of the triangle. The average bond order between C and S or O is 4/3. The state of protonation is usually not specified. These anions are good nucleophiles and good ligands.

Thiocarbonates are salts of those ions as well (e.g. potassium trithiocarbonate, K_{2}CS_{3}).

Thiocarbonates are esters of those ions as well (e.g. dimethyl trithiocarbonate, (CH_{3}S)_{2}CS). They contain trigonal planar divalent functional groups R–CS_{3−x}O_{x}–R similar to these anions (x = 0, 1, or 2, R is organyl group). Esters with the formula R−O−C(=S)−S−R are also called xanthates, while esters with the formula R−S−C(=S)−S−R are also called thioxanthates.

Thiocarbonates can also be salts of organyl thiocarbonate ions (e.g. sodium ethyl xanthate or SEX, CH_{3}CH_{2}OCS^{−}_{2}Na^{+}). They contain R–CS_{3−x}O^{−}_{x} anions (x = 0, 1, or 2, R is organyl group). Anions with the formula R−O−CS^{−}_{2}, and their salts, are also called xanthates, while salts with the formula R−S−CS^{−}_{2}, and their salts, are also called thioxanthates.

== Monothiocarbonate ==
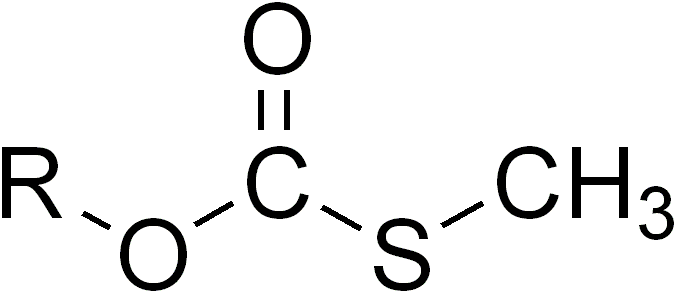
S-methyl monothiocarbonate

Monothiocarbonate is the dianion CO_{2}S^{2−}, which has C_{2v} symmetry. Monothiocarbonate arises by the hydrolysis of thiophosgene or the reaction of base with carbonyl sulfide:

COS + 2 NaOH → Na_{2}CO_{2}S + H_{2}O

The esters of monothiocarbonic acids are called monothiocarbonates as well (e.g. O-ethyl-S-methyl monothiocarbonate CH_{3}CH_{2}OC(O)SCH_{3}).

== Dithiocarbonates ==
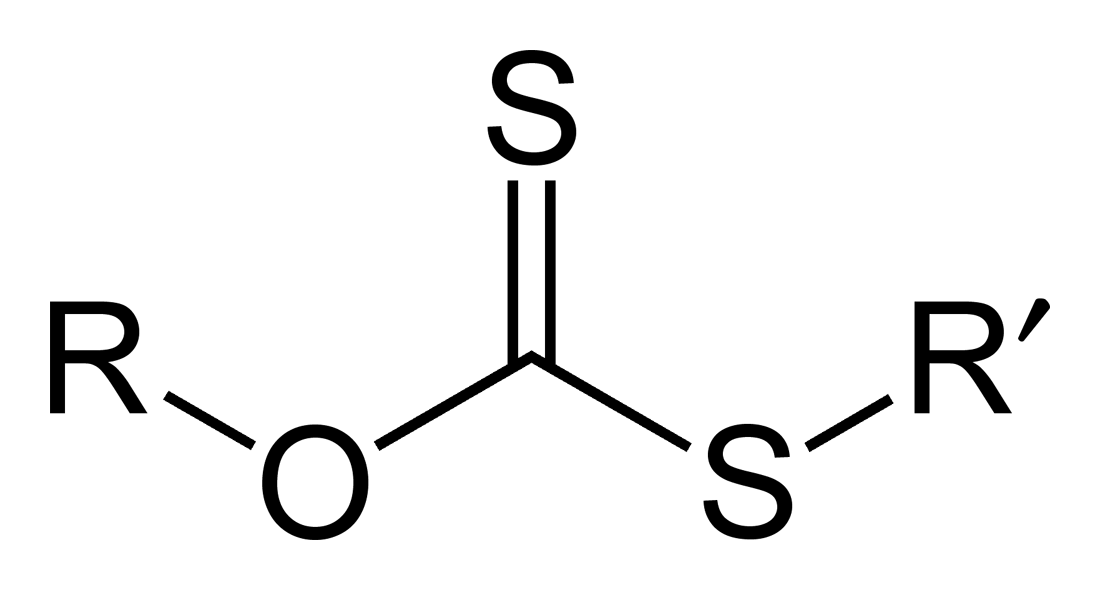
A xanthate-ester

Dithiocarbonate is the dianion COS^{2−}_{2}, which has C_{2v} symmetry. It arises from the reaction of aqueous base with carbon disulfide:

CS_{2} + 2 NaOH → Na_{2}COS_{2} + H_{2}O

Important derivatives of dithiocarbonates are the xanthates (O-esters of dithiocarbonates), with the formula ROCS^{−}_{2}. These salts are typically prepared by the reaction of sodium alkoxides with carbon disulfide.

Another group of dithiocarbonates have the formula (RS)_{2}CO. They are often derived by hydrolysis of the corresponding trithiocarbonates (RS)_{2}CS. One example is tetrathiapentalenedione, a heterocycle that consists of two dithiocarbonate groups.

== Trithiocarbonates ==
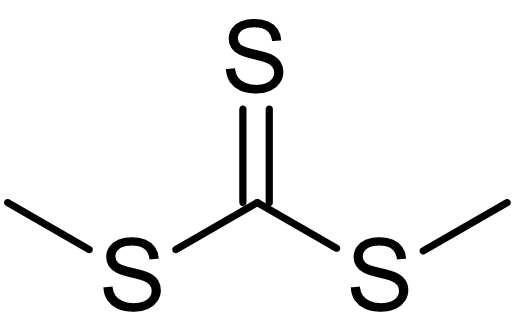
Dimethyl trithiocarbonate

Trithiocarbonate is the dianion CS^{2−}_{3}, which has D_{3h} symmetry. Trithiocarbonate is prepared by the reaction of sodium hydrosulfide (NaSH) with carbon disulfide:

CS_{2} + 2 NaSH → Na_{2}CS_{3} + H_{2}S

The relatively elusive trithiocarbonic acid H_{2}CS_{3} has been characterized by X-ray crystallography.

Esters of thiocarbonic acid, such as dimethyl trithiocarbonate ((CH_{3}S)_{2}CS) are also called thioxanthate esters. Trithiocarbonate esters inhibit the enzyme carbonic anhydrase.

Sodium 1,3-dithiole-2-thione-4,5-dithiolate abbreviated Na_{2}dmit is one of several cyclic trithiocarbonates.

== Perthiocarbonates ==
Addition of sulfur to trithiocarbonate gives the perthiocarbonate anion CS^{2−}_{4}, which contains one sulfur–sulfur bond.

Perthiocarbonic acid (or tetrathioperoxycarbonic acid / disulfanylmethanedithioic acid / CAS#13074-70-9) has never been obtained in pure form.

== See also ==
- Trithiocarbonic acid
- Xanthate
- Thioxanthate
- Sodium ethyl xanthate (SEX)
- Potassium ethyl xanthate (KEX)
- Potassium amyl xanthate
- Potassium trithiocarbonate
- Ethyl xanthic acid
