= T2-induced deoxynucleotide kinase =

Class of enzymes

Identifiers
- EC no.: 2.7.4.12
- CAS no.: 37278-99-2

Databases
- IntEnz: IntEnz view
- BRENDA: BRENDA entry
- ExPASy: NiceZyme view
- KEGG: KEGG entry
- MetaCyc: metabolic pathway
- PRIAM: profile
- PDB structures: RCSB PDB PDBe PDBsum
- Gene Ontology: AmiGO / QuickGO
Search
- PMC: articles
- PubMed: articles
- NCBI: proteins

T2-induced deoxynucleotide kinase (EC 2.7.4.12) is an enzyme that catalyzes two related chemical reactions. The first converts the nucleotide, deoxyguanosine monophosphate, to deoxyguanosine diphosphate by transferring a phosphate group from the cofactor, adenosine triphosphate (ATP), which is converted to adenosine diphosphate (ADP).

deoxyguanosine monophosphate
ATP
ADP
ATP
ADP
deoxyguanosine diphosphate

Similarly, thymidine monophosphate is converted to thymidine diphosphate:

thymidine monophosphate
ATP
ADP
ATP
ADP
thymidine diphosphate

The enzyme was characterised from Escherichia coli infected with the virus, enterobacteria phage T2, and carried out these reactions at rates up to 20 times those of uninfected cells.

This enzyme is a transferase, specifically one transferring phosphorus-containing groups (phosphotransferases) with a phosphate group as acceptor. The systematic name of this enzyme class is ATP:(d)NMP phosphotransferase.
