= Potassium trithiocarbonate =

Identifiers
CAS Number	584-10-1
3D model (JSmol)	Interactive image
ChemSpider	9259726
ECHA InfoCard	100.008.667
EC Number	247-959-3
PubChem CID	117858
UNII	VQQ1LG370N
CompTox Dashboard (EPA)	DTXSID80181260
- InChI: InChI=1S/CH2O2S.2K/c2-1(3)4;;/h4H,(H,2,3);;/q;2*+1/p-2 Key: JOKZZQQDSRIMNE-UHFFFAOYSA-L
- SMILES: C(=O)([O-])[S-].[K+].[K+]

Properties
Chemical formula	K_{2}CS_{3}
Molar mass	186.39 g·mol^{−1}
Appearance	White solid, often brown due to impurities

Related compounds
Related compounds	Trithiocarbonic acid
- Except where otherwise noted, data are given for materials in their standard state (at 25 °C [77 °F], 100 kPa). Infobox references

Potassium trithiocarbonate is the inorganic compound with the chemical formula K_{2}CS_{3}. It is the potassium salt of trithiocarbonic acid. It consists of two potassium cations K^{+} and the trigonal planar trithiocarbonate dianion CS^{2−}_{3}. It is a white solid, although impure samples often appear brown. It is prepared by the reaction of potassium sulfide or potassium hydrosulfide with carbon disulfide.

K_{2}S + CS_{2} → K_{2}CS_{3}

Potassium trithiocarbonate reacts with alkylating agents to give trithiocarbonate esters:

K_{2}CS_{3} + 2 RX → (RS)_{2}CS + 2 KX (X = halogen, R = monovalent organyl group)
