= Thiocarbonic acid =

Trithiocarbonic acid

Names
- IUPAC name Carbonotrithioic acid
- Systematic IUPAC name Trithiocarbonic acid
- Other names: Dithiocarbon sulfide; Sulfocarbonic acid; Thiocarbonic acid; Trisulfocarbonic acid

Identifiers
CAS Number	594-08-1
3D model (JSmol)	Interactive image
ChEBI	CHEBI:36967
ChemSpider	62204
ECHA InfoCard	100.008.931
EC Number	209-822-6
MeSH	C013321
PubChem CID	68982
UNII	O27JHO40J8
CompTox Dashboard (EPA)	DTXSID00862140
- InChI: InChI=1S/CH2S3/c2-1(3)4/h(H2,2,3,4) Key: HIZCIEIDIFGZSS-UHFFFAOYSA-N
- SMILES: C(=S)(S)S

Properties
Chemical formula	H_{2}CS_{3}
Molar mass	110.21 g·mol^{−1}
Appearance	Red oily liquid, yellow crystalline solid
Density	1.483 g/cm^{3} (liquid)
Melting point	−26.8 °C; −16.3 °F; 246.3 K
Boiling point	58 °C; 136 °F; 331 K

Related compounds
Related compounds	Carbonic acid; Thiosulfuric acid; Thiocarbonate; Xanthic acid; Thioxanthate; Ethyl xanthic acid; Thiocyanic acid; Thiocyanate; Potassium trithiocarbonate; Dimethyl trithiocarbonate; Ethylene trithiocarbonate; Thiourea; Thiocarbamate; Thiophosphoric acid
- Except where otherwise noted, data are given for materials in their standard state (at 25 °C [77 °F], 100 kPa). verify (what is ?) Infobox references

Thiocarbonic acid is an acid with the chemical formula H_{2}CS_{3} (or S=C(SH)_{2}). It is an analog of carbonic acid H_{2}CO_{3} (or O=C(OH)_{2}), in which all oxygen atoms are replaced with sulfur atoms. It is an unstable, hydrophobic, red oily liquid.

It is often referred to as trithiocarbonic acid so as to differentiate it from other carbonic acids containing sulfur, such as monothiocarbonic O,O-acid S=C(OH)_{2}, monothiocarbonic O,S-acid O=C(OH)(SH), dithiocarbonic O,S-acid S=C(OH)(SH) and dithiocarbonic S,S-acid O=C(SH)_{2} (see thiocarbonates).

== Discovery and synthesis ==
It was first reported in brief by Zeise in 1824 and later in more detail by Berzelius in 1826, in both cases it was produced by the action of carbon disulfide on a hydrosulfide salt (e.g. potassium hydrosulfide).

CS_{2} + 2 KSH → K_{2}CS_{3} + H_{2}S

Treatment with acids liberates the thiocarbonic acid as a red oil:

K_{2}CS_{3} + 2 HX → H_{2}CS_{3} + 2 KX

Both the acid and many of its salts are unstable and decompose via the release of carbon disulfide, particularly upon heating:

H_{2}CS_{3} → CS_{2} + H_{2}S

An improved synthesis involves addition of barium trithiocarbonate to hydrochloric acid at 0 °C. This method provided samples with which many measurement have been made.

BaCS_{3} + 2 HCl → H_{2}CS_{3} + BaCl_{2}

Despite its lability, crystals of thiocarbonic acid have been examined by X-ray crystallography, which confirms the anticipated molecular structure of a trigonal planar molecular geometry at the central carbon atom. The C-S bond lengths range from 1.69 to 1.77 Å.

== Reactions and derivatives ==
Thiocarbonic acid is acidic, with the first pK_{a} being around 2. The second pK_{a} is near 7. It dissolves S_{8}, but does not react with it.

Salts and esters of trithiocarbonic acid are called trithiocarbonates, and they are sometimes called thioxanthates.

Thiocarbonic acid reacts with bifunctional reagents to give rings. 1,2-Dichloroethane gives ethylene trithiocarbonate (S=CS_{2}(CH_{2})_{2}). Oxalyl chloride gives oxalyl trithiocarbonate (S=CS_{2}(C=O)_{2}).

Some of the organic trithiocarbonates
Ethylene trithiocarbonate

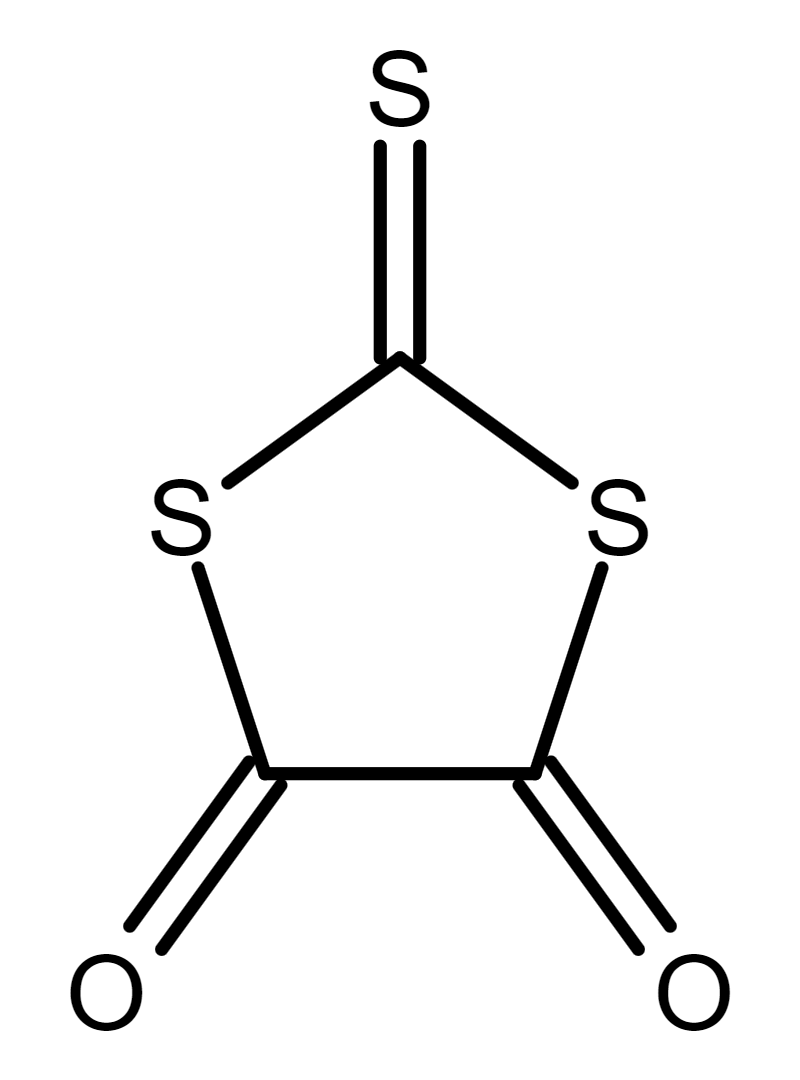
Oxalyl trithiocarbonate

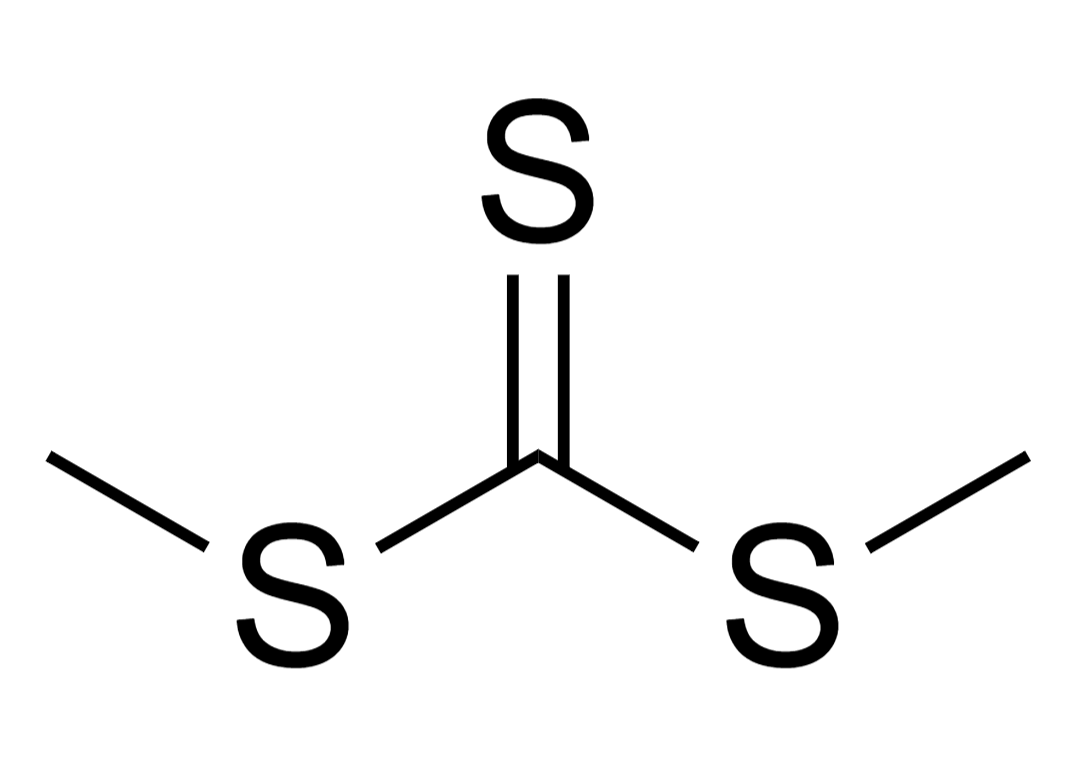
Dimethyl trithiocarbonate

== Applications ==
Thiocarbonic acid currently has no significant applications. Its esters find use in RAFT polymerization.
