= C10H15N5O10P2 =

The molecular formula C_{10}H_{15}N_{5}O_{10}P_{2} may refer to:

- Adenosine diphosphate
- Adenosine 3',5'-bisphosphate
- Deoxyguanosine diphosphate
