= C3H6S3 =

The molecular formula C_{3}H_{6}S_{3} (molar mass: 138.26 g/mol) may refer to:

- Dimethyl trithiocarbonate
- 1,3,5-Trithiane
