= Isoamyl butyrate =

Names
- IUPAC name 3-methylbutyl butanoate
- Other names: 3-Methyl-1-butyl butanoate; 3-Methylbutyl butanoate; 3-Methylbutyl butyrate; Butyric acid isoamyl ester; Isoamyl butanoate; Isoamyl-n-butyrate; Isopentyl butanoate; Isopentyl butyrate

Identifiers
CAS Number	106-27-4
3D model (JSmol)	Interactive image
ChEBI	CHEBI:87422
ChEMBL	ChEMBL3187370
ChemSpider	7507
ECHA InfoCard	100.003.074
EC Number	203-380-8
PubChem CID	7795
UNII	505AFM77VU
CompTox Dashboard (EPA)	DTXSID3042059
- InChI: InChI=1S/C9H18O2/c1-4-5-9(10)11-7-6-8(2)3/h8H,4-7H2,1-3H3 Key: PQLMXFQTAMDXIZ-UHFFFAOYSA-N
- SMILES: CCCC(=O)OCCC(C)C

Properties
Chemical formula	C_{9}H_{18}O_{2}
Molar mass	158.241 g·mol^{−1}
Appearance	colorless
Density	0.88 g/cm^{3}
Melting point	−73.2 °C (−99.8 °F; 200.0 K)
Boiling point	178 °C (352 °F; 451 K)
Solubility in water	118 mg/L
Solubility	soluble in most fixed oils insoluble in glycerol and propylene glycol
Solubility in ethanol	1 mL in 4 mL 70% ethanol
log P	3.250
Refractive index (n_{D})	1.409-1.414

Hazards
- GHS labelling
Pictograms	(GHS02: Flammable)
Signal word	Warning
Hazard statements	H226, H412
Precautionary statements	P210, P233, P240, P241, P242, P243, P273, P280, P303+P361+P353, P370+P378, P403+P235, P501
Flash point	59 °C (138 °F; 332 K)
- Except where otherwise noted, data are given for materials in their standard state (at 25 °C [77 °F], 100 kPa). Infobox references

Isoamyl butyrate is an organic compound from the group of butyric acid esters.

== Properties ==
Isoamyl butyrate is a low-volatility, colorless liquid with a fruity odor that is practically insoluble in water. The compound has a pear aroma.

== Synthesis ==
Isoamyl butyrate can be obtained by esterification of isoamyl alcohol with butyric acid.

== Occurrence ==
Isopentyl butyrate occurs naturally in Eucalyptus macarthurii, coconut oil, and various fruits such as apples, apricots, bananas, mangoes, and melons, as well as in honey and whisky.

== Usage ==
Isoamyl butyrate is used as a flavoring agent in the food industry.
