= Thioxanthate =

In chemistry, a thioxanthate is an organosulfur compound with the formula RSCS_{2}X. When X is an alkali metal, the thioxanthate is a salt. When X is a transition metal, the thioxanthate is a ligand, and when X is an organic group, the compounds are called thioxanthate esters. They are usually yellow colored compounds that often dissolve in organic solvents. They are used as precursors to some catalysts, froth flotation agents, and additives for lubricants.

== Preparation and reactions ==
The alkali metal thioxanthates are produced by treating a thiol with a base in the presence of carbon disulfide, as illustrated by the preparation of sodium ethyl thioxanthate:.

EtSH + NaOH + CS_{2} → EtSCS^{−}_{2}Na^{+} + H_{2}O

Sodium ethyl thioxanthate is similar structurally to sodium ethyl xanthate.

Alkylation of thioxanthate anions gives thioxanthate esters. The preparation of ethyl methyl thioxanthate is a simple illustration:

EtSCS^{−}_{2}Na^{+} + MeI → EtSCS_{2}Me + NaI

Thioxanthate esters are also called esters of trithiocarbonate.

== See also ==
- Thiocarbonic acid
- Thiocarbonate
