= Sodium bis(2-methoxyethoxy)aluminium hydride =

- Structural formula of sodium bis(2-methoxyethoxy)aluminium hydride

Names
- IUPAC name Sodium bis(2-methoxyethoxy)aluminium hydride
- Other names Red-Al, Synhydrid, Vitride, SDMA

Identifiers
CAS Number	22722-98-1
3D model (JSmol)	Interactive image; Interactive image
Abbreviations	SMEAH
ChemSpider	21169529
ECHA InfoCard	100.041.056
PubChem CID	16684438
UNII	04JL3B71VP
CompTox Dashboard (EPA)	DTXSID90894051
- InChI: InChI=1S/2C3H7O2.Al.Na.2H/c2*1-5-3-2-4;;;;/h2*2-3H2,1H3;;;;/q2*-1;2*+1;; Key: XJIQVZMZXHEYOY-UHFFFAOYSA-N
- SMILES: [Na+].COCCO[AlH2-]OCCOC; [H][Al-](OCCOC)([H])OCCOC.[Na+]

Properties
Chemical formula	C_{6}H_{16}AlNaO_{4}
Molar mass	202.161 g·mol^{−1}
Appearance	Transparent crystals
Density	1.122 g/cm^{3} (solid); 1.036 g/mL (>60% solution)
Melting point	205 to 214 °C (401 to 417 °F; 478 to 487 K) (decomposes)
Viscosity	65.1 cps (70% solution)

Hazards
- Occupational safety and health (OHS/OSH)
Main hazards	Highly flammable; moisture sensitive; potent skin irritant
- Except where otherwise noted, data are given for materials in their standard state (at 25 °C [77 °F], 100 kPa). Infobox references

Sodium bis(2-methoxyethoxy)aluminium hydride (SMEAH; trade names Red-Al, Synhydrid, Vitride) is a hydride reductant with the formula NaAlH_{2}(OCH_{2}CH_{2}OCH_{3})_{2}. It is also commonly known as SDMA (sodium dihydrido-bis(2-methoxyethoxy)aluminate) in scientific literature and chemical catalogs. The trade name Red-Al refers to its being a reducing aluminium compound. It is used predominantly as a reducing agent in organic synthesis. The compound features a tetrahedral aluminium center attached to two hydride and two alkoxide groups, the latter derived from 2-methoxyethanol. Commercial solutions are colorless/pale yellow and viscous. At low temperatures (below −60°C), the solution solidifies to a glassy pulverizable substance with no sharp melting point.

SMEAH is a versatile hydride reducing agent. It readily converts epoxides, aldehydes, ketones, carboxylic acids, esters, acyl halides, and anhydrides to the corresponding alcohols. Nitrogen derivates such as amides, nitriles, imines, and most other organonitrogen compounds are reduced to the corresponding amines. Nitroarenes can be converted to azoxyarenes, azoarenes, or hydroazoarenes, depending on the reaction conditions.

Some common functional group reductions using SMEAH can be found below:

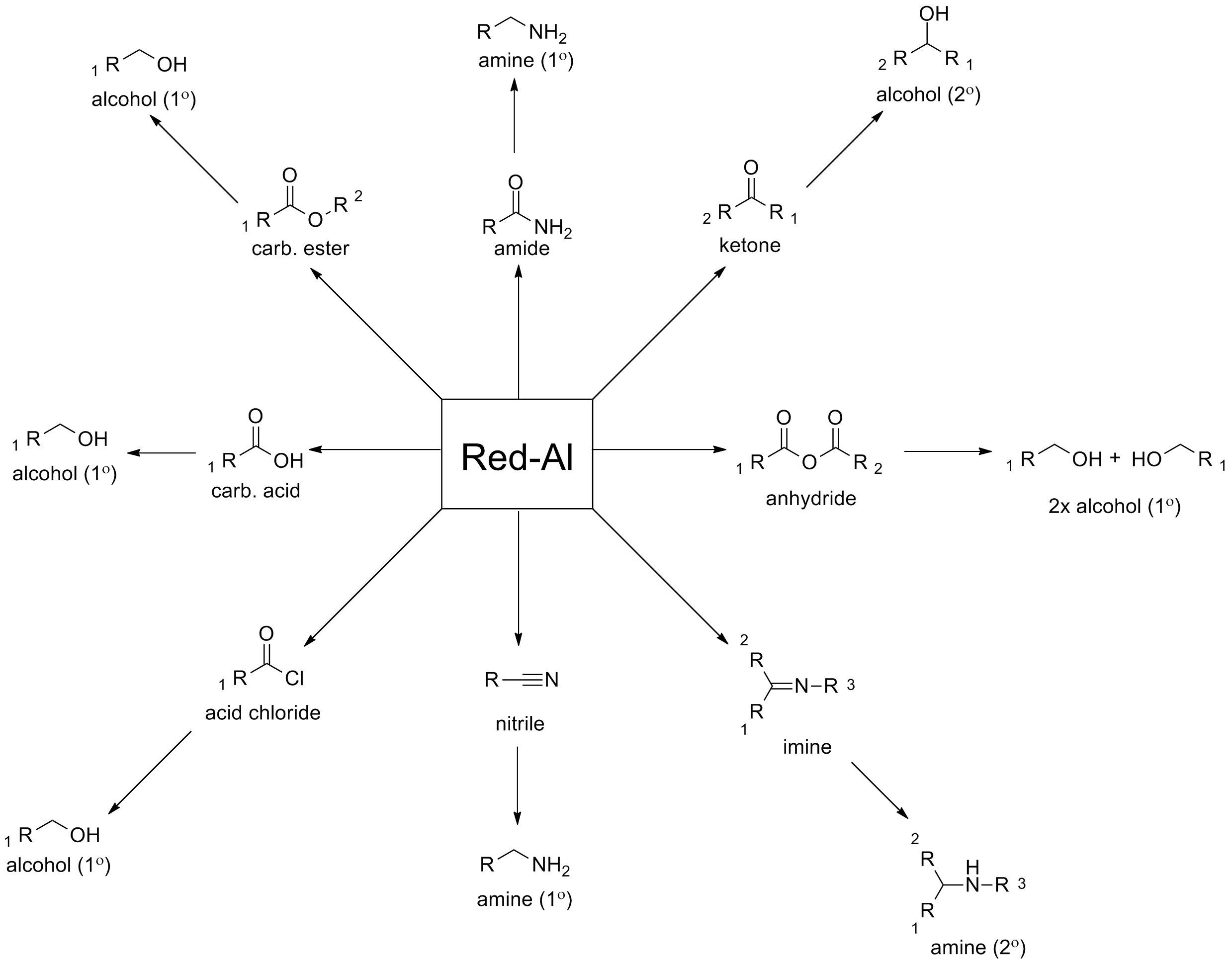
Common functional group reductions using Red-Al

== Comparison with lithium aluminium hydride ==
As a reagent, SMEAH is comparable with lithium aluminium hydride (LAH, LiAlH_{4}).

It is a safer alternative to LAH and related hydrides. SMEAH exhibits similar reducing effects, but does not have the inconvenient pyrophoric nature, short shelf-life, or limited solubility of LAH. Upon contact with air and moisture, SMEAH reacts exothermically but does not ignite, and tolerates temperatures up to 200°C. Under dry conditions it has unlimited shelf life. It is soluble in aromatic solvents, whereas LAH is only soluble in ethers. For example, a solution greater than 70 wt.% concentration in toluene is commercially available. The reagent can be modified to effect partial reductions.

SMEAH in toluene under reflux has been used to reduce aliphatic p-toluenesulfonamides (TsNR_{2}) to the corresponding free amines and is one of the few reagents that can carry out this challenging reduction in general settings. Notably, LiAlH_{4} does not reduce this functional group unless forcing conditions are used.
