= Zinc pyrophosphate =

- Zinc pyrophosphate

Names
- Other names Dizinc diphosphate

Identifiers
CAS Number	7446-26-6
3D model (JSmol)	Interactive image
ChemSpider	56393
ECHA InfoCard	100.028.367
PubChem CID	62641
UNII	6ERT96A621
CompTox Dashboard (EPA)	DTXSID0064705
- InChI: InChI=1S/H4O7P2.2Zn/c1-8(2,3)7-9(4,5)6;;/h(H2,1,2,3)(H2,4,5,6);;/q;2*+2/p-4 Key: OMSYGYSPFZQFFP-UHFFFAOYSA-J; InChI=1/H4O7P2.2Zn/c1-8(2,3)7-9(4,5)6;;/h(H2,1,2,3)(H2,4,5,6);;/q;2*+2/p-4 Key: OMSYGYSPFZQFFP-XBHQNQODAA
- SMILES: [Zn+2].[Zn+2].[O-]P([O-])(=O)OP([O-])([O-])=O

Properties
Chemical formula	Zn_{2}P_{2}O_{7}
Molar mass	304.72 g/mol
Appearance	White crystalline powder
Density	3.75 g/cm^{3}
Solubility in water	Insoluble
Solubility	Soluble in dilute acids
- Except where otherwise noted, data are given for materials in their standard state (at 25 °C [77 °F], 100 kPa). verify (what is ?) Infobox references

Zinc pyrophosphate (Zn_{2}P_{2}O_{7}) is an ionic inorganic chemical compound composed of Zn^{2+} cations and pyrophosphate (P_{2}O_{7}^{4−}) anions.

== Preparation ==
Zinc pyrophosphate can be obtained from the thermal decomposition of zinc ammonium phosphate.

2 ZnNH_{4}PO_{4} → Zn_{2}P_{2}O_{7} + 2 NH_{3} + H_{2}O

It can also be obtained from the reaction between sodium carbonate, zinc oxide, and ammonium dihydrogen phosphate.

Na_{2}O_{3} + 2 ZnO + 2 (NH_{4})H_{2}PO_{4} → Zn_{2}P_{2}O_{7} + 2 NaOH + 2 NH_{3} + 2 H_{2}O + CO_{2}

It is also produced when a strongly acidic solution of zinc sulfate is heated with sodium pyrophosphate.

2 ZnSO_{4} + Na_{4}P_{2}O_{7} → Zn_{2}P_{2}O_{7} + 2 Na_{2}SO_{4}

Another method is precipitating zinc as a phosphate, then heating over 1123 K.

== Properties ==
Zinc pyrophosphate is a white crystalline solid that is insoluble in water. On heating in water, it decomposes to form Zn_{3}(PO_{4})_{2} and ZnHPO_{4}.

Zn_{2}P_{2}O_{7} + H_{2}O → 2 ZnHPO_{4}

It crystallizes in the monoclinic system. The α-form crystallizes at low temperatures and the β-form crystallizes at high temperatures.

== Uses ==
Zinc pyrophosphate is used as a pigment. It is useful in gravimetric analysis of zinc.
