= Ethylene trithiocarbonate =

Names
- Other names 1,3-dithiolane-2-thione

Identifiers
CAS Number	822-38-8
3D model (JSmol)	Interactive image
ChemSpider	12641
EC Number	212-498-9
PubChem CID	13196
UNII	QE427K8FTH
- InChI: InChI=1S/C3H4S3/c4-3-5-1-2-6-3/h1-2H2 Key: XCWPBWWTGHQKDR-UHFFFAOYSA-N
- SMILES: C1CSC(=S)S1

Properties
Chemical formula	C_{3}H_{4}S_{3}
Molar mass	136.25 g·mol^{−1}
Appearance	yellow solid
Melting point	37 °C (99 °F; 310 K)
Boiling point	95–105 °C (203–221 °F; 368–378 K) 0.01 torr
- Except where otherwise noted, data are given for materials in their standard state (at 25 °C [77 °F], 100 kPa). Infobox references

Ethylene trithiocarbonate is an organosulfur compound with the formula C_{2}H_{4}S_{2}CS. This yellow solid is prepared by alkylation of trithiocarbonate with 1,2-dibromoethane. Ethylene trithiocarbonate is an intermediate in the synthesis of tetrathiafulvalene and its derivatives.
