= Deoxyadenosine monophosphate =

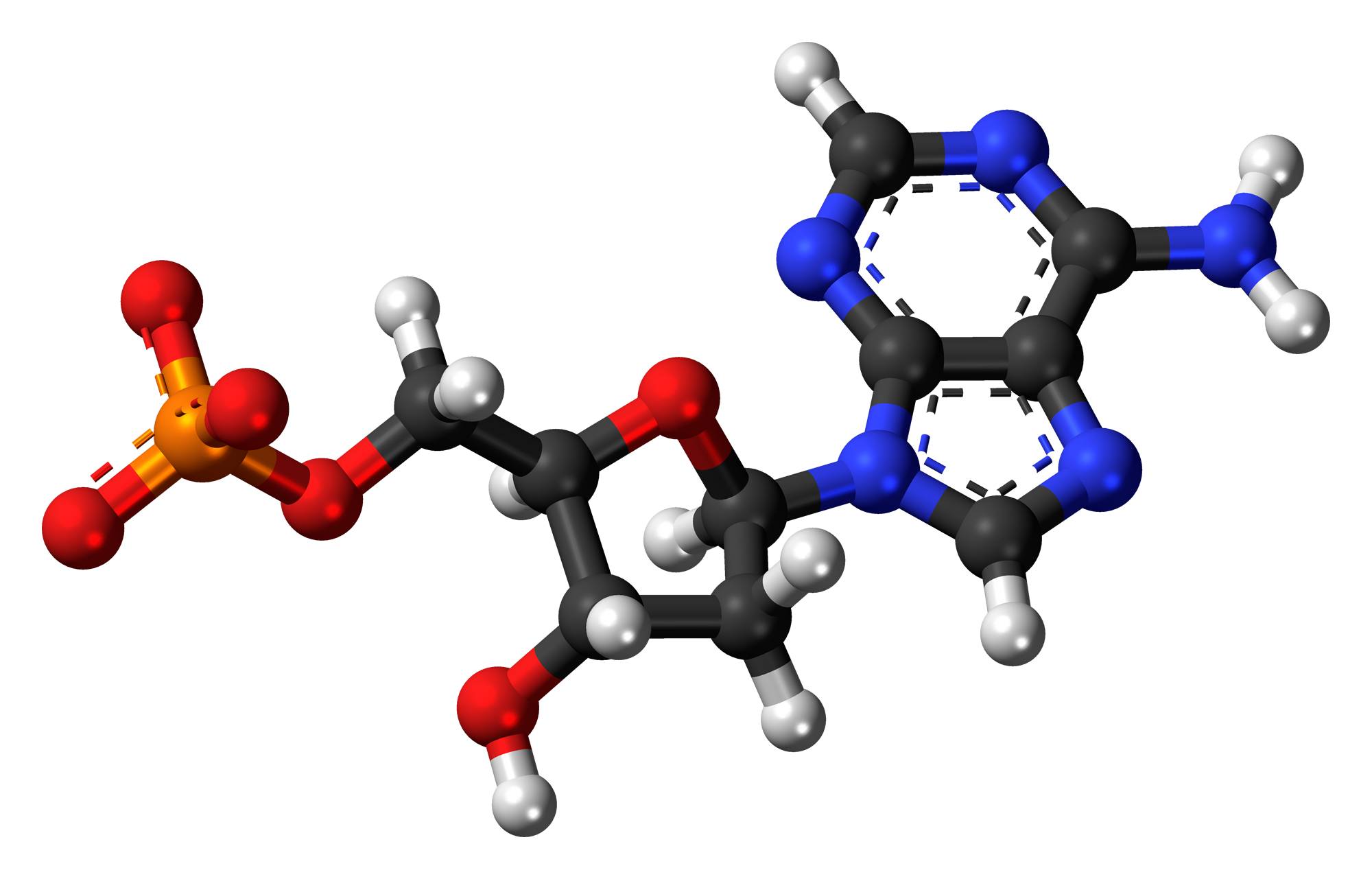

Names
- IUPAC name 2′-Deoxyadenylic acid
- Systematic IUPAC name [(2R,3S,5R)-5-(6-Amino-9H-purin-9-yl)-3-hydroxyoxolan-2-yl]methyl dihydrogen phosphate

Identifiers
CAS Number	653-63-4
3D model (JSmol)	Interactive image
ChEBI	CHEBI:17713
ChemSpider	12079
ECHA InfoCard	100.010.459
IUPHAR/BPS	5120
MeSH	Deoxyadenosine+monophosphate
PubChem CID	621
UNII	VFR8I97ORM
CompTox Dashboard (EPA)	DTXSID901034859
- InChI: InChI=1S/C10H14N5O6P/c11-9-8-10(13-3-12-9)15(4-14-8)7-1-5(16)6(21-7)2-20-22(17,18)19/h3-7,16H,1-2H2,(H2,11,12,13)(H2,17,18,19)/t5-,6+,7+/m0/s1 Key: KHWCHTKSEGGWEX-RRKCRQDMSA-N; InChI=1/C10H14N5O6P/c11-9-8-10(13-3-12-9)15(4-14-8)7-1-5(16)6(21-7)2-20-22(17,18)19/h3-7,16H,1-2H2,(H2,11,12,13)(H2,17,18,19)/t5-,6+,7+/m0/s1 Key: KHWCHTKSEGGWEX-RRKCRQDMBS
- SMILES: c1nc(c2c(n1)n(cn2)[C@H]3C[C@@H]([C@H](O3)COP(=O)(O)O)O)N

Properties
Chemical formula	C_{10}H_{14}N_{5}O_{6}P
Molar mass	331.222 g/mol
- Except where otherwise noted, data are given for materials in their standard state (at 25 °C [77 °F], 100 kPa). verify (what is ?) Infobox references

Deoxyadenosine monophosphate (dAMP), also known as deoxyadenylic acid or deoxyadenylate in its conjugate acid and conjugate base forms, respectively, is a derivative of the common nucleotide adenosine monophosphate (AMP), in which the -OH (hydroxyl) group on the 2' carbon on the nucleotide's pentose has been reduced to just a hydrogen atom (hence the "deoxy-" part of the name). Deoxyadenosine monophosphate is abbreviated dAMP. It is a monomer used in DNA.

== Chemical Properties ==
The overall structure of dAMP is shaped largely by how its parts interact with each other. In particular, the adenine base and the phosphate group can form hydrogen bond interactions. The distance between the atoms involved in these bonds helps shape the overall conformation of dAMP. The character of these interactions shifts with the molecule’s charge state. When the molecule gains or loses charge, it causes the spacing between the atoms to fluctuate. Increasing the negative charge, tends to draw the atoms closer together, causing the strength of the hydrogen bond to increase as well. Protonation of the adenine increases the strength of the hydrogen bonds. The presence of water molecules can also stabilize the structure by forming additional hydrogen bonds with the phosphate group and the adenine base.

== See also ==
- Nucleic acid
- DNA metabolism
- Cofactor
- Guanosine
- Cyclic AMP (cAMP)
- ATP
