= Chan rearrangement =

Chemical reaction

The Chan rearrangement is a chemical reaction that involves rearranging an acyloxy acetate (1) in the presence of a strong base to a 2-hydroxy-3-keto-ester (2).

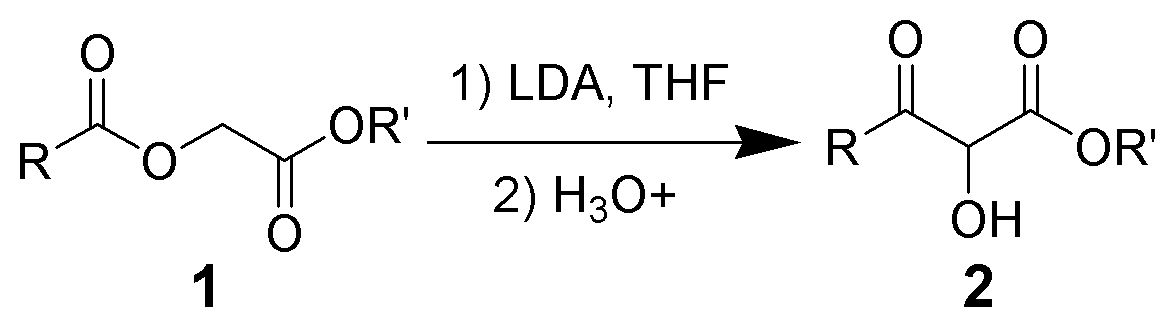
The Chan rearrangement

This procedure was employed in the Holton Taxol total synthesis.

== Reaction mechanism ==
The methylene bridge in the reactant with adjacent carbonyl and acetyl substituents is acidic and can be deprotonated by strong non-nucleophilic bases such as lithium tetramethylpiperidide or lithium diisopropylamide (LDA) as in an aldol reaction. The thus formed enolate then attacks the adjacent acetyl group through a short lived intermediate oxirane. Acidic workup liberates the free hydroxyl group.

The mechanism of the Chan rearrangement

== See also ==
- Darzens reaction
