= Dimethyl trithiocarbonate =

Methyl ester of trithiocarbonic acid

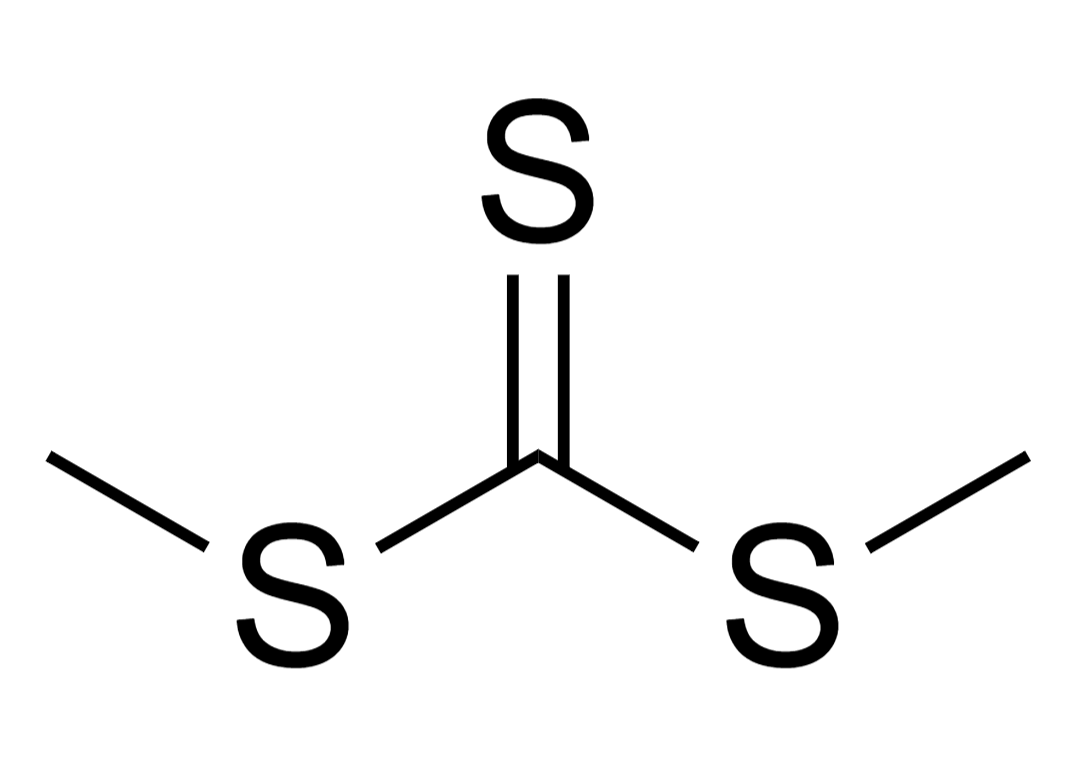

Names
- IUPAC name Bis(methylsulfanyl)methanethione
- Preferred IUPAC name Dimethyl trithiocarbonate
- Other names: Carbonotrithioic acid, dimethyl ester; Dimethyl carbonotrithioate; Trithiocarbonic acid, dimethyl ester

Identifiers
CAS Number	2314-48-9
3D model (JSmol)	Interactive image
Abbreviations	Me_{2}CS_{3} (MeS)_{3}CS
ChemSpider	15959
PubChem CID	16840
CompTox Dashboard (EPA)	DTXSID90177710
- InChI: Key: IQWMXKTYXNMSLC-UHFFFAOYSA-N; InChI=1S/C3H6S3/c1-5-3(4)6-2/h1-2H3
- SMILES: CSC(=S)SC

Properties
Chemical formula	(CH_{3}S)_{2}CS
Molar mass	138.26 g·mol^{−1}
Appearance	Yellow liquid
Odor	Stench
Density	1.254 g/cm^{3}
Melting point	−3 °C (27 °F; 270 K)
Boiling point	101–102 °C (214–216 °F; 374–375 K) at 16 hPa
Refractive index (n_{D})	1.675

Hazards
Flash point	97 °C (207 °F)

Related compounds
Related compounds	Dimethyl carbonate
- Except where otherwise noted, data are given for materials in their standard state (at 25 °C [77 °F], 100 kPa). Infobox references

Dimethyl trithiocarbonate is an organic compound with the chemical formula S=C(SCH_{3})_{2}. It is a methyl ester of trithiocarbonic acid. This chemical belongs to a subcategory of esters called thioesters. It is a sulfur analog of dimethyl carbonate O=C(OCH_{3})_{2}, where all three oxygen atoms are replaced with sulfur atoms. Dimethyl trithiocarbonate is a yellow liquid with a strong and unpleasant odor.

== Synthesis ==
In terms of its name, dimethyl trithiocarbonate is formally derived by esterification of trithiocarbonic acid with methanethiol.

One synthesis starts from thiophosgene as described in this simplified equation:

CSCl_{2} + 2 CH_{3}SH → CS(SCH_{3})_{2} + 2 HCl

Alternatively, it can be prepared by treating carbon disulfide with aqueous base, a phase-transfer catalyst, and methyl iodide.

== Uses ==
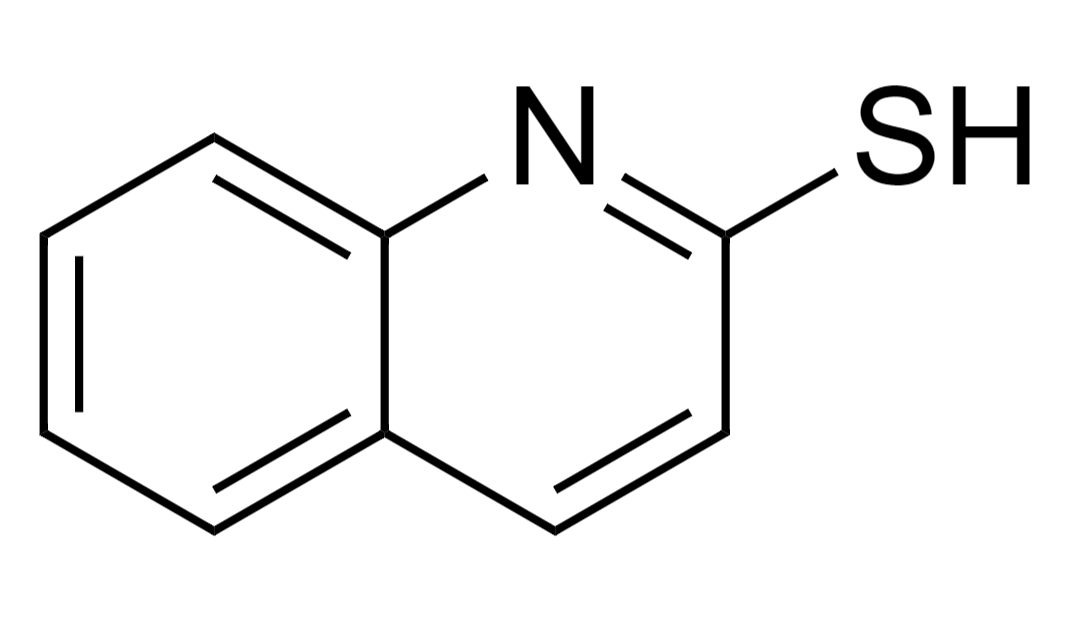
2-Mercaptoquinoline, potential antileishmanial agent, a chemical prepared using dimethyl trithiocarbonate

Dimethyl trithiocarbonate is used in preparation of methyl-β,β′-dicarbonyldithiocarboxylate derivatives, in generation of tris(organothiyl)methyl radicals (RS)_{3}C•, and in preparation of β-oxodithiocarboxylates. Dimethyl trithiocarbonate is also a useful reagent in the preparation of 2-mercaptoquinoline and its analogues which are potential antileishmanial agents.

== Hazards and toxicity ==
Dimethyl trithiocarbonate is combustible. Upon catching fire, irritating, suffocating and toxic gases are released, like carbon oxides and sulfur oxides.
