= Deoxyadenosine diphosphate =

Chemical compound

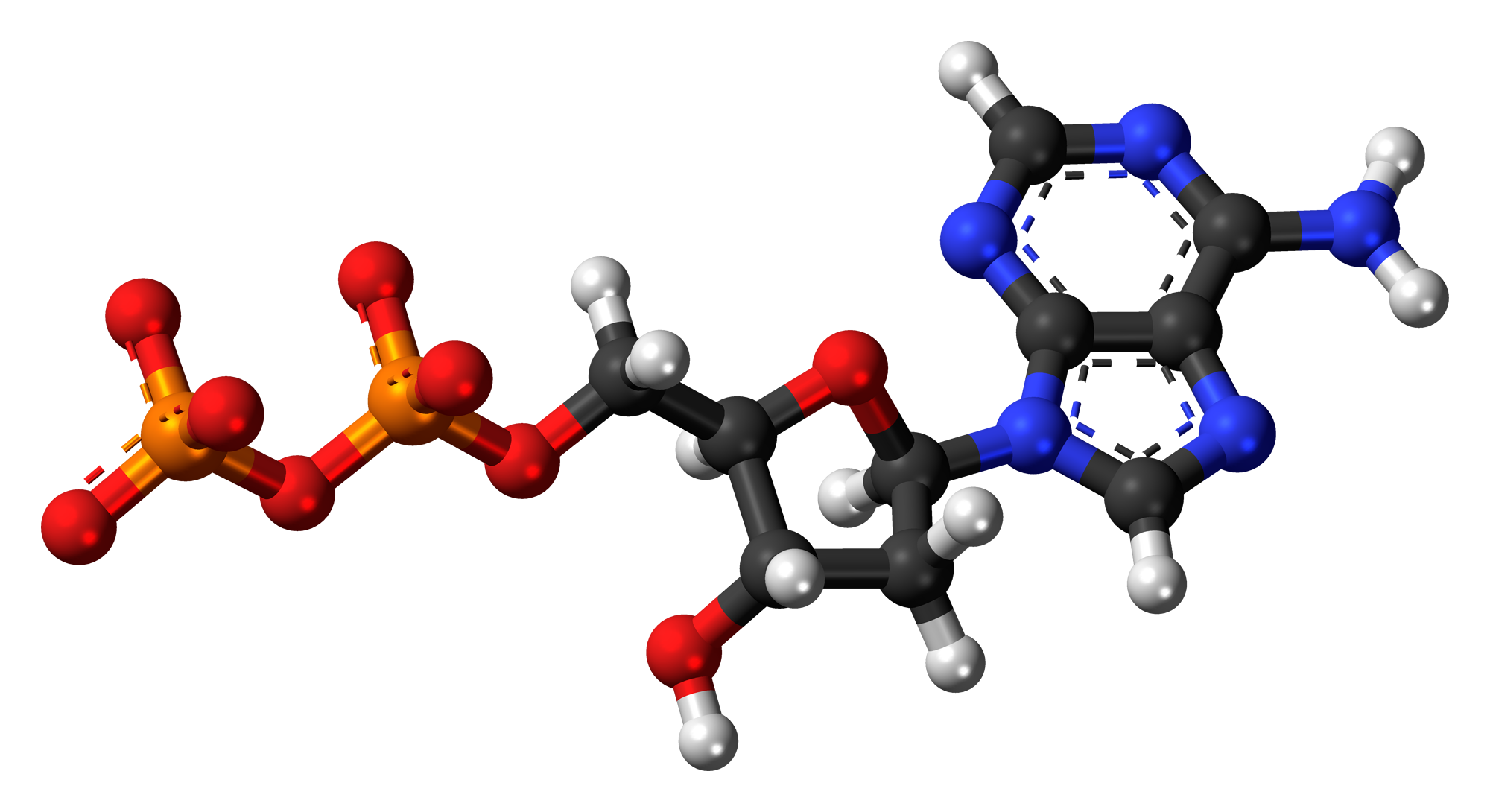

Names
- IUPAC name 2′-Deoxyadenosine 5′-(trihydrogen diphosphate)
- Systematic IUPAC name [(2R,3S,5R)-5-(6-Amino-9H-purin-9-yl)-3-hydroxyoxolan-2-yl]methyl trihydrogen diphosphate
- Other names dADP

Identifiers
CAS Number	2793-06-8
3D model (JSmol)	Interactive image
ChemSpider	164196
MeSH	Deoxyadenosine+diphosphate
PubChem CID	188966
UNII	APQ916I0QD
CompTox Dashboard (EPA)	DTXSID90950621
- InChI: InChI=1S/C10H15N5O9P2/c11-9-8-10(13-3-12-9)15(4-14-8)7-1-5(16)6(23-7)2-22-26(20,21)24-25(17,18)19/h3-7,16H,1-2H2,(H,20,21)(H2,11,12,13)(H2,17,18,19)/t5-,6+,7+/m0/s1 Key: DAEAPNUQQAICNR-RRKCRQDMSA-N; InChI=1/C10H15N5O9P2/c11-9-8-10(13-3-12-9)15(4-14-8)7-1-5(16)6(23-7)2-22-26(20,21)24-25(17,18)19/h3-7,16H,1-2H2,(H,20,21)(H2,11,12,13)(H2,17,18,19)/t5-,6+,7+/m0/s1 Key: DAEAPNUQQAICNR-RRKCRQDMBL
- SMILES: C1[C@@H]([C@H](O[C@H]1N2C=NC3=C(N=CN=C32)N)COP(=O)(O)OP(=O)(O)O)O

Properties
Chemical formula	C_{10}H_{15}N_{5}O_{9}P_{2}
Molar mass	411.201722
- Except where otherwise noted, data are given for materials in their standard state (at 25 °C [77 °F], 100 kPa). verify (what is ?) Infobox references

Deoxyadenosine diphosphate is a nucleoside diphosphate. It is related to the common nucleic acid adenosine triphosphate (ATP), with the -OH (hydroxyl) group on the 2' carbon on the nucleotide's pentose removed (hence the deoxy- part of the name), and with one fewer phosphoryl group than ATP. This makes it also similar to adenosine diphosphate except with a hydroxyl group removed.

Deoxyadenosine diphosphate is abbreviated dADP.

== See also ==
- Cofactor
- Guanosine
- Cyclic adenosine monophosphate
