= Organyl group =

Organic substituent with one or more free valences at a carbon atom

In organic and organometallic chemistry, an organyl group (commonly denoted by the letter "R") is an organic substituent with one or sometimes more free valence electrons at a carbon atom. The term is often used in chemical patent literature to protect claims over a broad scope.

== Examples ==
- Acetonyl group
- Acyl group (e.g. acetyl group, benzoyl group)
- Alkyl group (e.g. methyl group, ethyl group)
- Alkenyl group (e.g. vinyl group, allyl group)
- Alkynyl group (e.g. propargyl group, ethynyl group)
- Aryl group (e.g. phenyl group, tolyl group)
- Benzyloxycarbonyl group (Cbz)
- tert-butoxycarbonyl group (Boc)
- Carboxyl group
