= Deoxyguanosine diphosphate =

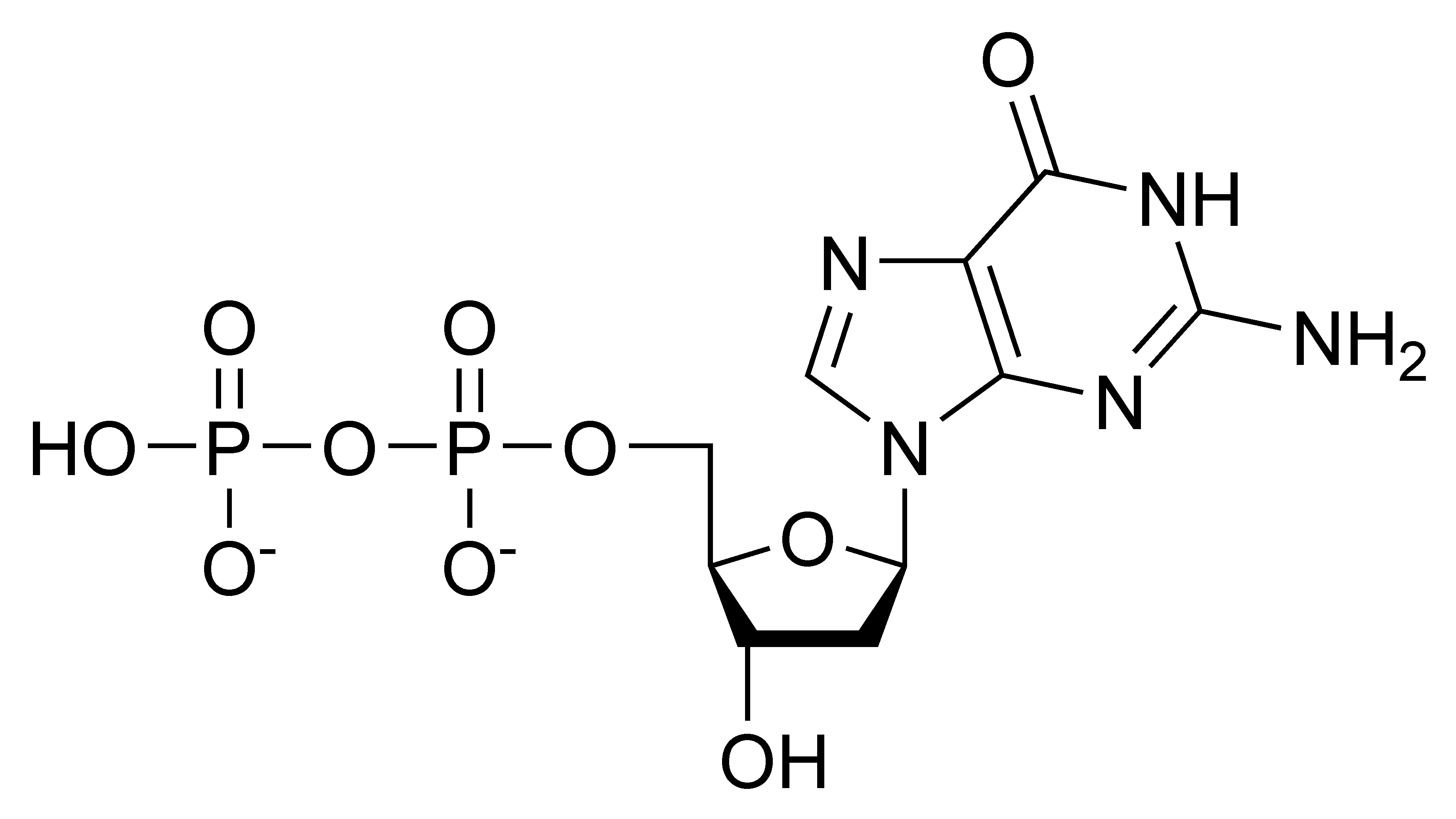

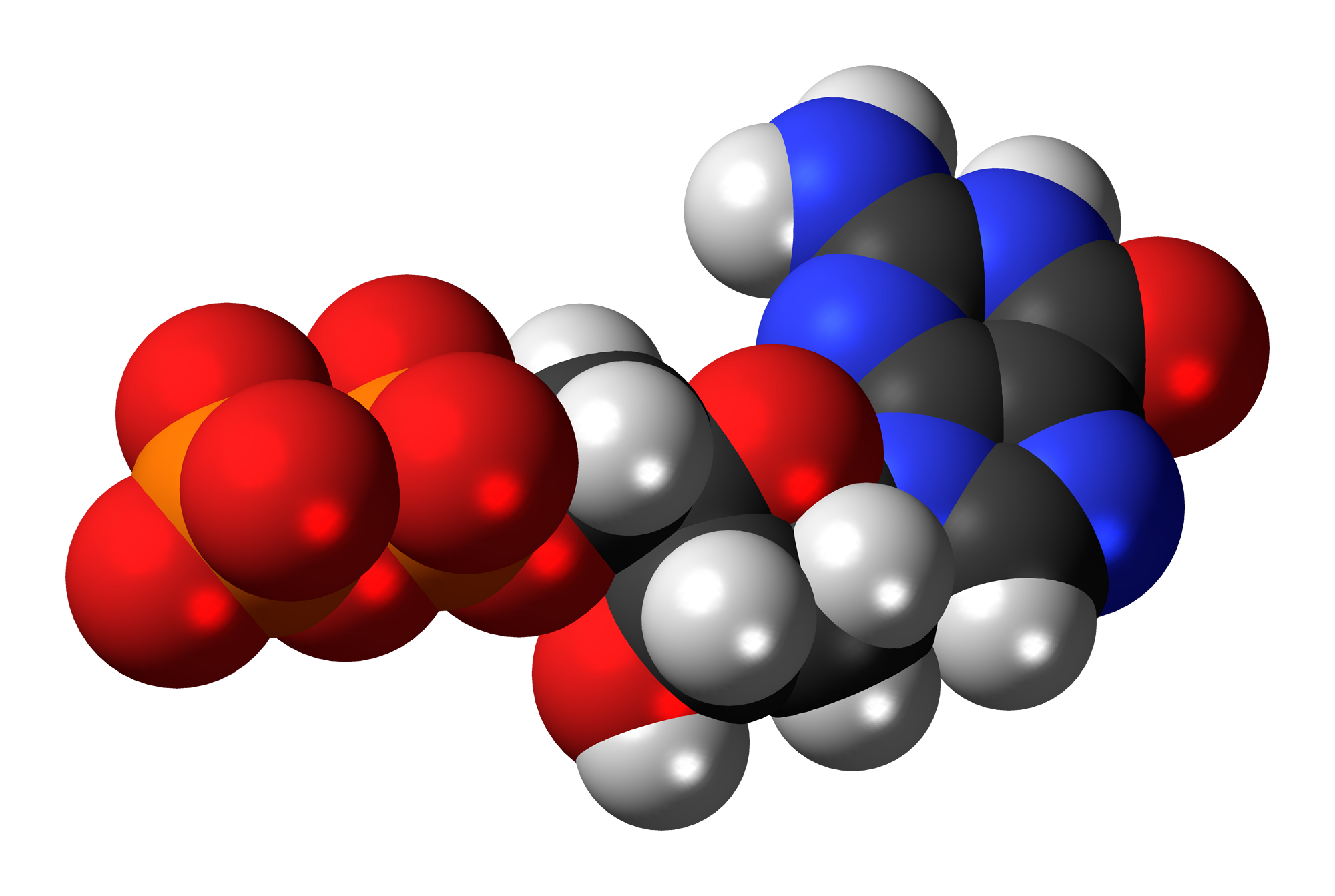

Names
- IUPAC name 2′-Deoxyguanosine 5′-(trihydrogen diphosphate)
- Systematic IUPAC name [(2R,3S,5R)-5-(2-Amino-6-oxo-1,6-dihydro-9H-purin-9-yl)-3-hydroxyoxolan-2-yl]methyl trihydrogen diphosphate
- Other names dGDP; 2'-Deoxyguanosine-5'-diphosphate; 2'-Deoxy-GDP; 5'-dGDP

Identifiers
CAS Number	3493-09-2
3D model (JSmol)	Interactive image
ChEBI	CHEBI:28862
ChemSpider	388359
DrugBank	DB03491
PubChem CID	439220
UNII	4RQT5B7A8J
CompTox Dashboard (EPA)	DTXSID00869376
- InChI: InChI=1S/C10H15N5O10P2/c11-10-13-8-7(9(17)14-10)12-3-15(8)6-1-4(16)5(24-6)2-23-27(21,22)25-26(18,19)20/h3-6,16H,1-2H2,(H,21,22)(H2,18,19,20)(H3,11,13,14,17)/t4-,5+,6+/m0/s1 Key: CIKGWCTVFSRMJU-KVQBGUIXSA-N; InChI=1/C10H15N5O10P2/c11-10-13-8-7(9(17)14-10)12-3-15(8)6-1-4(16)5(24-6)2-23-27(21,22)25-26(18,19)20/h3-6,16H,1-2H2,(H,21,22)(H2,18,19,20)(H3,11,13,14,17)/t4-,5+,6+/m0/s1 Key: CIKGWCTVFSRMJU-KVQBGUIXBA
- SMILES: O=P(O)(O)OP(=O)(O)OC[C@H]3O[C@@H](n1cnc2c1NC(=N/C2=O)\N)C[C@@H]3O

Properties
Chemical formula	C_{10}H_{15}N_{5}O_{10}P_{2}
Molar mass	427.203 g·mol^{−1}
- Except where otherwise noted, data are given for materials in their standard state (at 25 °C [77 °F], 100 kPa). verify (what is ?) Infobox references

Deoxyguanosine diphosphate (dGDP) is a nucleoside diphosphate. It is related to the common nucleic acid guanosine triphosphate (GTP), with the -OH group on the 2' carbon on the nucleotide's pentose removed (hence the deoxy- part of the name), and with one fewer phosphoryl group than GTP.

== See also ==
- Cofactor
- Guanosine
