= Minerals Separation, Limited =

Minerals Separation Ltd, was a small London-based company involved in developing a technique of ore extraction.

== History ==
Organised in 1903 by South African John Ballot, the firm moved to experiment with new processes as well as acquire patents of others until they had perfected a froth flotation process. This was perfected on Broken Hill, Australia mill tailings. The first patent that they purchased was for the Catermole process, but they also purchased patent rights to Alcide Froment's process.

By the 1910s, the firm's Australian process was generally accepted as so great an advance over any process known before that it promptly came into extensive use for the concentration of ores in most of the principal mining countries of the world. It largely replaced all earlier ore extraction processes and is today known as froth flotation.

Its most important patent was the discovery that a small percentage of oil, agitated into a froth, was needed to make the process commercially successful at Broken Hill. The patent was received for this process in Britain in 1905 and then the next year around the world but especially in the United States. Minerals Separation, Limited obtained U.S. Patent No. 835,120, issued on November 6, 1906, to Henry Livingston Sulman, Hugh Fitzalis Kirkpatrick-Picard (the two prominent consultant metallurgists and directors of the firm) and John Ballot. As stated in the specification of the patent, the claimed discovery related "to improvements in the process for the concentration of ores, the object being to separate metalliferous matter from gangue by means of oils, fatty acids, or other substances which have a preferential affinity for such metalliferous matter over gangue." Between 1910 and 1912, Minerals Separation Limited acquired use of the process of ore dressing known as De Bavay's Sulphide Process.

In 1913, they acquired the patent for a differential flotation process, capable of reliably separating lead and zinc sulphide ores, held by Fleury James (Jim) Lyster (1872–1948), who perfected a technique, at the Broken Hill plant of Zinc Corporation.

In 1914, they also acquired the important Bradford patent for differential flotation. And in 1923, Minerals Separation staff chemists in the San Francisco office, Cornelius Keller and Carl Lewis under director Edward H. Nutter, perfected the use of chemical xanthates, replacing the use of oil and easing the workings in the froth cells. The firm moved into research for the use of flotation in nonmetals as well, such as potash.

Prior to these discoveries, it was well known that oil and oily substances had a selective affinity or attraction for, and would unite mechanically with, the minute particles of metal and metallic compounds found in crushed or powdered ores, but would not so unite with the quartz, or rocky non-metallic material, called gangue. It was also well known that this selective property of oils and oily substances was increased when applied to some ores by the addition of a small amount of acid to the ore and water used in process of concentration. Authors of early books on the flotation process related tales of froth flotation roots back to the writings of Herodotus, and listed a series of "flotation" patents back to the mid-nineteenth century.

Because of the many claims of primacy, Minerals Separation's history is one of constant litigation over its patents, with the British House of Lords and the U. S. Supreme Court (twice) deciding in its favour. The process of the patent in suit consisted in the use of an amount of oil which is critical and minute compared with the amount used in prior processes, amounting to a fraction of 1 percent on the ore and in impregnating with air the mass of ore and water by agitation. Xanthates all but eliminated the need for the oils and instigated another round of lawsuits in the 1920s, which Minerals Separation again won.

These court victories "earned for itself (Minerals Separation, Ltd) the cordial detestation of many in the mining world."

Minerals Separation, Ltd, organized subsidiaries. In 1911, the company opened an office in San Francisco under Edward Nutter, which eventually incorporated as the Minerals Separation North American Corporation. During World War I, John Ballot relocated to the United States, as president of the firm with headquarters in New York. He died a few months before the 1922 final settlement of a suit with the Daniel C. Jackling companies (Utah Copper, Nevada Con, Ray Con, Chino, Butte & Superior and others), which netted $5,000,000 in back license fees. With the expiration of the patents, and the royalties received for licensing, Minerals Separation went out of the flotation research and patent business during the 1950s.

Minerals Separation had an association with the informal alliance of Anglo-Australian companies known as the Collins House Group.

Minerals Separation Limited was finally dissolved in the UK, as an inactive company, in March 2021.

== See also ==
- Minerals Separation, Ltd. v. Hyde
- James M. Hyde, engaged in patent infringement suit
