= Sodium ethyl xanthate =

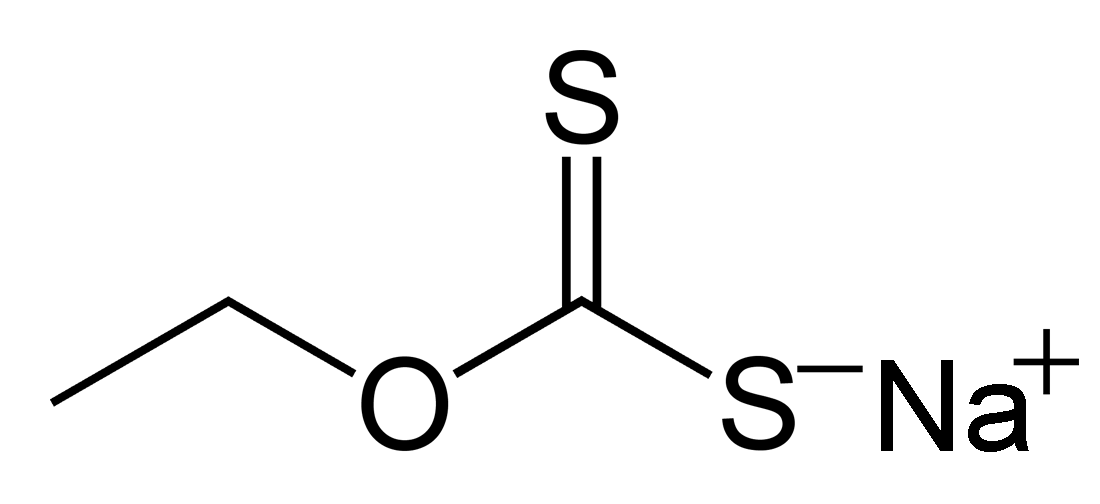

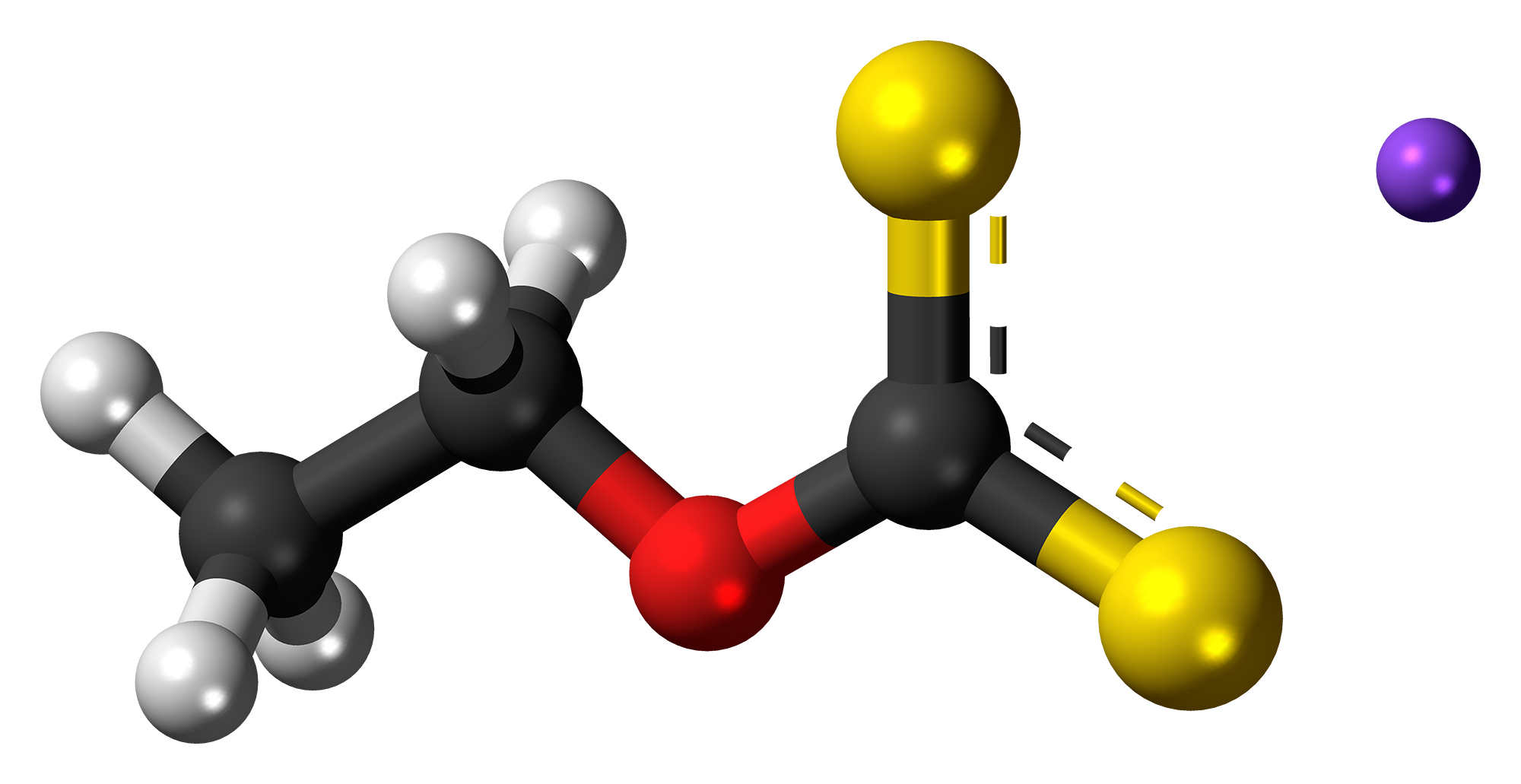

Names
- IUPAC name sodium O-ethylcarbonodithioate
- Other names Sodium ethylxanthogenate Sodium-O-ethyl dithiocarbonate SEX

Identifiers
CAS Number	140-90-9
3D model (JSmol)	Interactive image
Abbreviations	SEX
ChemSpider	8493
ECHA InfoCard	100.004.947
EC Number	205-440-9
PubChem CID	23690437
UNII	3R5A3652VK
CompTox Dashboard (EPA)	DTXSID1044801
- InChI: InChI=1S/C3H6OS2.Na/c1-2-4-3(5)6;/h2H2,1H3,(H,5,6);/q;+1/p-1 Key: RZFBEFUNINJXRQ-UHFFFAOYSA-M
- SMILES: CCOC(=S)[S-].[Na+]

Properties
Chemical formula	C_{3}H_{5}NaOS_{2}
Molar mass	144.18 g·mol^{−1}
Appearance	Pale yellow powder
Density	1.263 g/cm^{3}
Melting point	182 to 256 °C (360 to 493 °F; 455 to 529 K)
Boiling point	decomposes
Solubility in water	450 g/L (10 °C)
Acidity (pK_{a})	1.6
Basicity (pK_{b})	12.4

Hazards
- GHS labelling
Pictograms	(GHS02: Flammable) (GHS05: Corrosive) (GHS06: Toxic) (GHS07: Exclamation mark)
Signal word	Danger
Hazard statements	H228, H302, H311, H314, H315, H319, H332, H335
Precautionary statements	P210, P240, P241, P260, P264, P270, P271, P280, P301+P312, P301+P330+P331, P302+P352, P303+P361+P353, P304+P312, P304+P340, P305+P351+P338, P310, P312, P321, P322, P330, P332+P313, P337+P313, P361, P362, P363, P370+P378, P403+P233, P405, P501
Autoignition temperature	250 °C (482 °F; 523 K)
- Except where otherwise noted, data are given for materials in their standard state (at 25 °C [77 °F], 100 kPa). verify (what is ?) Infobox references

Sodium ethyl xanthate (SEX) is an organosulfur compound with the chemical formula CH_{3}CH_{2}OCS_{2}Na. It is a pale yellow powder, which is usually obtained as the dihydrate. Sodium ethyl xanthate is used in the mining industry as a flotation agent. A closely related potassium ethyl xanthate (KEX) is obtained as the anhydrous salt.

== Production ==
Akin to the preparation of most xanthates, sodium ethyl xanthate can be prepared by treating sodium ethoxide with carbon disulfide:
CH_{3}CH_{2}ONa + CS_{2} → CH_{3}CH_{2}OCS_{2}Na

== Properties and reactions ==
Sodium ethyl xanthate is a pale yellow powder. Its aqueous solutions are stable at high pH if not heated. It rapidly hydrolyses at pH less than 9 at 25 °C. It is the conjugate base of the ethyl xanthic acid, a strong acid with pK_{a} of 1.6 and pK_{b} estimated as 12.4 for the conjugate base. Sodium ethyl xanthate easily adsorbs on the surface of many sulfide minerals, a key step in froth flotation.

Xanthates are susceptible to hydrolysis and oxidation at low pH:

C_{2}H_{5}OCS_{2}Na + H^{+} → C_{2}H_{5}OH + CS_{2} + Na^{+}

Oxidation gives diethyl dixanthogen disulfide:

4C_{2}H_{5}OCS_{2}Na + 2H_{2}O + O_{2} → 2(C_{2}H_{5}OCS_{2})_{2} + 4 NaOH

== Detection ==
Sodium ethyl xanthate can be identified through optical absorption peaks in the infrared (1179, 1160, 1115, 1085 cm^{−1}) and ultraviolet (300 nm) ranges. There are at least six chemical detection methods:

1. Iodometric method relies on oxidation to dixanthogen by iodine, with the product detected with a starch indicator. This method is however is not selective and suffers from interferences with other sulfur-containing chemicals.
2. Xanthate can be reacted with a copper sulfate or copper tartrate resulting in a copper xanthate residue which is detected with iodine. This method has an advantage of being is insensitive to sulfite, thiosulfate and carbonate impurities.
3. In the acid-base detection method, a dilute aqueous xanthate solution is reacted with a copious amount of 0.01 M hydrochloric acid yielding carbon disulfide and alcohol, which are evaluated. The excess acid and impurities are removed through filtering and titration.
4. In the argentometric method, sodium ethyl xanthate is reacted with silver nitrate in a dilute solution. The resulted silver xanthate is detected with 10% aqueous solution of iron nitrate. The drawbacks of this method are high cost of silver and blackening of silver xanthate by silver nitrate that reduces the detection accuracy.
5. In the mercurimetric method, xanthate is dissolved in 40% aqueous solution of dimethylamine, followed by heating and titration with o-hydroxymercuribenzoate. The product is detected with dithiofluorescein.
6. Perchloric acid method involves dissolution of xanthate in water-free acetic acid. The product is titrated with perchloric acid and detected with crystal violet.

Sodium ethyl xanthate can also be quantified using gravimetry, by weighing the lead xanthate residue obtained after reacting SEX with 10% solution of lead nitrate. There are also several electrochemical detection methods, which can be combined with some of the above chemical techniques.

== Applications ==
Sodium ethyl xanthate is used in the mining industry as flotation agent for recovery of metals, such as copper, nickel, silver or gold, as well as solid metal sulfides or oxides from ore slurries. This application was introduced by Cornelius H. Keller in 1925. Other applications include defoliant, herbicide, and an additive to rubber to protect it against oxygen and ozone.

In 2000, Australia produced up to 10,000 tonnes of sodium ethyl xanthate and imported about 6,000 tonnes, mostly from China. The material produced in Australia is the so-called 'liquid sodium ethyl xanthate' that refers to a 40% aqueous solution of the solid. It is obtained by treating carbon disulfide with sodium hydroxide and ethanol. Its density is 1.2 g/cm^{3} and the freezing point is −6 °C.

== Safety ==
Sodium ethyl xanthate has moderate oral and dermal toxicity in animals and is irritating to eyes and skin. It is especially toxic to aquatic life and therefore its disposal is strictly controlled. Median lethal dose for (male albino mice, oral, 10% solution at pH~11) is 730 mg/kg of body weight, with most deaths occurring in the first day. The most affected organs were the central nervous system, liver and spleen.

Since 1993, sodium ethyl xanthate is classified as a Priority Existing Chemical in Australia, meaning that its manufacture, handling, storage, use or disposal may result in adverse health or environment effects. This decision was justified by the widespread use of the chemical in industry and its decomposition to the toxic and flammable carbon disulfide gas. From two examples of sodium ethyl xanthate spillage in Australia, one resulted in evacuation of 100 people and hospitalization of 6 workers who were exposed to the fumes. In another accident, residents of the spillage area complained of headache, dizziness, and nausea. Consequently, during high-risk sodium ethyl xanthate handling operations, workers are required by the Australian regulations to be equipped with protective clothing, anti-static gloves, boots and full-face respirators or self-contained breathing apparatus.

== Bibliography ==
- Priority existing chemical Report No. 5 Sodium Ethyl Xanthate, National Industrial Chemicals Notification and Assessment Scheme, Dep. of Health and Ageing, Australian Government (1995) ISBN 0-644-35283-3
- Priority Existing Chemical. Secondary Notification Assessment Report No. 5S Sodium Ethyl Xanthate, National Industrial Chemicals Notification and Assessment Scheme, Dep. of Health and Ageing, Australian Government, (February 2000) ISBN 0-642-42198-6
