= Archibald Carmichael =

Archibald Carmichael may refer to:

- Archibald H. Carmichael (1864–1947), U.S. representative from Alabama
- Archibald M. Carmichael (1882–1959), Canadian farmer, minister, teacher and politician
- A. D. Carmichael (Archibald Drummond Carmichael, 1859–?), industrial chemist
