= Diethyl dixanthogen disulfide =

Names
- Preferred IUPAC name O^{1},O^{3}-Diethyl 2-(dithioperoxy)-1,3-dithiodicarbonic acid
- Other names Auligen, Antigal, Dixanthogen

Identifiers
CAS Number	502-55-6
3D model (JSmol)	Interactive image
ChEMBL	ChEMBL331743
ChemSpider	9975
KEGG	D07366
PubChem CID	10404
UNII	RN4CQ46FDM
- InChI: InChI=1S/C6H10O2S4/c1-3-7-5(9)11-12-6(10)8-4-2/h3-4H2,1-2H3 Key: FVIGODVHAVLZOO-UHFFFAOYSA-N
- SMILES: S=C(SSC(=S)OCC)OCC

Properties
Chemical formula	C_{6}H_{10}O_{2}S_{4}
Molar mass	242.38 g·mol^{−1}
Appearance	yellow solid
Density	1.23 g/cm^{3}
Melting point	30 °C (86 °F; 303 K)

Pharmacology
ATC code	P03AA01 (WHO)
- Except where otherwise noted, data are given for materials in their standard state (at 25 °C [77 °F], 100 kPa). verify (what is ?) Infobox references

Diethyl dixanthogen disulfide (DEXD) is the organosulfur compound with the formula (C_{2}H_{5}OC(S)S)_{2}. It is one of the most common dixanthogen disulfides, compounds of the type (ROC(S)S)_{2} (R = alkyl). A yellow solid, It is obtained by oxidation of sodium ethylxanthate or potassium ethylxanthate.

According to X-ray crystallography, the two C_{2}H_{5}OC(S)S) groups in solid diethyl dixanthogen disulfide are planar and are linked by a disulfide bond. The C-S-S-C dihedral angle is near 90°, as is common for acyclic disulfides.

== Occurrence and reactions ==
Diethylxanthogen reacts with aqueous base to regenerate the xanthate, at least partially.

Diethylxanthogen arises by oxidation of xanthates during froth flotation. Diethylxanthogens are thought to participate in the flotation of certain sulfide minerals.
