= Dixanthogen disulfide =

Structure of diethyl dixanthogen disulfide.

Dixanthogen disulfides are a class of organosulfur compounds with the formula (ROC(S)S)_{2}. Usually yellow solids, they are the product of the oxidation of xanthate salts. A common derivative is diethyl dixanthogen disulfide. Diisopropyl dixanthogen disulfide is commercially available. They are structurally related to thiuram disulfides.

== Uses and reactions ==
Diethyl dixanthogen disulfide is a component for froth flotations used, inter alia, for the separation of sulfide minerals like pyrrhotite. Diisopropyl dixanthogen disulfide is a reagent in the synthesis of sulfur heterocycles.

Dialkoxy dixanthogen disulfides undergo desulfurization by cyanide to give bis(alkoxythiocarbonyl)sulfides:

(ROC(S)S)_{2} + CN^{−} → (ROC(S))_{2}S + SCN^{−}

Dixanthogens are also ectoparasiticides.
