= Foam separation =

Chemical process

Foam separation is a chemical process which falls into a category of separation techniques called "Adsorptive bubble separation methods". It is further divided into froth flotation and foam fractionation. Foam separation is essential in order to prevent contamination of fermentation medium through the foam by external microbes.
