= Potassium amyl xanthate =

Names
- Preferred IUPAC name Potassium O-pentyl carbonodithioate
- Other names potassium pentylxanthogenate potassium-O-pentyl dithiocarbonate

Identifiers
CAS Number	2720-73-2
3D model (JSmol)	Interactive image
ChEMBL	ChEMBL2380741
ChemSpider	16668
ECHA InfoCard	100.018.481
EC Number	220-329-5
PubChem CID	493949
CompTox Dashboard (EPA)	DTXSID2062610
- InChI: InChI=1S/C6H12OS2.K/c1-2-3-4-5-7-6(8)9;/h2-5H2,1H3,(H,8,9);/q;+1/p-1 Key: YIBBMDDEXKBIAM-UHFFFAOYSA-M; InChI=1S/C6H12OS2.K/c1-2-3-4-5-7-6(8)9;/h2-5H2,1H3,(H,8,9);/q;+1/p-1
- SMILES: CCCCCOC(=S)[S-].[K+]

Properties
Chemical formula	C_{6}H_{11}KOS_{2}
Molar mass	202.37 g·mol^{−1}
Appearance	Pale yellow or yellow powder
Density	1.073 g/cm3
Solubility in water	Soluble

Hazards
- GHS labelling
Pictograms	(GHS02: Flammable) (GHS07: Exclamation mark) (GHS09: Environmental hazard)
Signal word	Warning
Hazard statements	H228, H302, H312, H315, H319, H335, H411
Precautionary statements	P210, P240, P241, P261, P264, P270, P271, P273, P280, P301+P312, P302+P352, P304+P340, P305+P351+P338, P312, P321, P322, P330, P332+P313, P337+P313, P362, P363, P370+P378, P391, P403+P233, P405, P501
- Except where otherwise noted, data are given for materials in their standard state (at 25 °C [77 °F], 100 kPa). verify (what is ?) Infobox references

Potassium amyl xanthate (/pəˈtæsiəm ˌæmɪl ˈzænθeɪt/) is an organosulfur compound with the chemical formula CH_{3}(CH_{2})_{4}OCS_{2}K. It is a pale yellow powder with a pungent odor that is soluble in water. It is widely used in the mining industry for the separation of ores using the flotation process.

== Production and properties ==
As typical for xanthates, potassium amyl xanthate is prepared by reacting n-amyl alcohol with carbon disulfide and potassium hydroxide.

CH_{3}(CH_{2})_{4}OH + CS_{2} + KOH → CH_{3}(CH_{2})_{4}OCS_{2}K + H_{2}O

Potassium amyl xanthate is a pale yellow powder. Its solutions are relatively stable between pH 8 and 13 with a maximum of stability at pH 10.

== Related compounds ==
- Sodium amyl xanthate is used in the separation of nickel and copper from their ores.

== Safety ==
The LD_{50} is 90-148 mg/kg (oral, rat).

It is a biodegradable compound.
