= Carrie Everson =

American metallurgist and inventor (1842-1914)

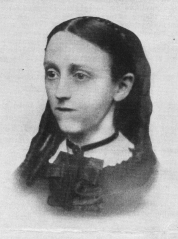
- Carrie Everson in 1864
- Born: Rebecca Jane Billings; 22 August 1843; Sharon, Norfolk County, Massachusetts, US
- Died: November 3, 1914 (aged 71); San Anselmo, Marin County, California, US
- Spouse: William Knight Everson
- Children: John Lewis Everson

Carrie Jane Everson (born Rebecca Jane Billings; 27 August 1842–3 November 1914) was an American inventor who patented processes for extracting valuable minerals from ore using froth flotation. The Mining Journal noted in 1916 that "as a metallurgist she was a quarter of a century in advance of her profession".

== Early life ==
Rebecca Jane Billings was born on 27 August 1842 in Massachusetts and grew up in Illinois, receiving a good education. She was known as Carrie Jane Everson after her marriage.

== Career ==
Everson discovered that if fats or oils are combined with an ore, the oils adhere to the metals and not the rock. On her lab bench she tested this technique with gold, copper, antimony, and arsenic ores. She was awarded two United States patents for her discoveries, US471174A and US474829A. By 1890, she had tested her process, with the help of others, at Georgetown and Silver Cliff, Colorado and at Baker, Oregon. During this period, her husband died and she returned to nursing school, a career she followed in Denver. In 1901, a lawyer misadvised her to not renew her patents just as the flotation process was being re-discovered in England.

After her patents had expired others used her methods which she lived to appreciate if not to benefit from.

Historians are inconclusive in assessing her impact on the development of the revolutionary flotation process, but agree that gender bias hampered her ability in promoting her process.

== Personal life ==
In 1864, she married Dr. William K. Everson, a Chicago physician. Everson had two sons: John Lewis Everson and George S. Everson (https://www.familysearch.org/ark:/61903/3:1:33SQ-GYBD-HSB?cc=1417683 )

She was buried at Mount Tamalpais Cemetery on November 17, 1914.

== Legacy ==
Everson was inducted into the American National Mining Hall of Fame in 2008.
