= Potassium ethyl xanthate =

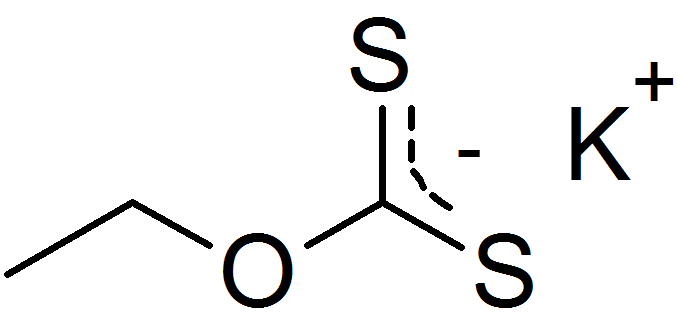

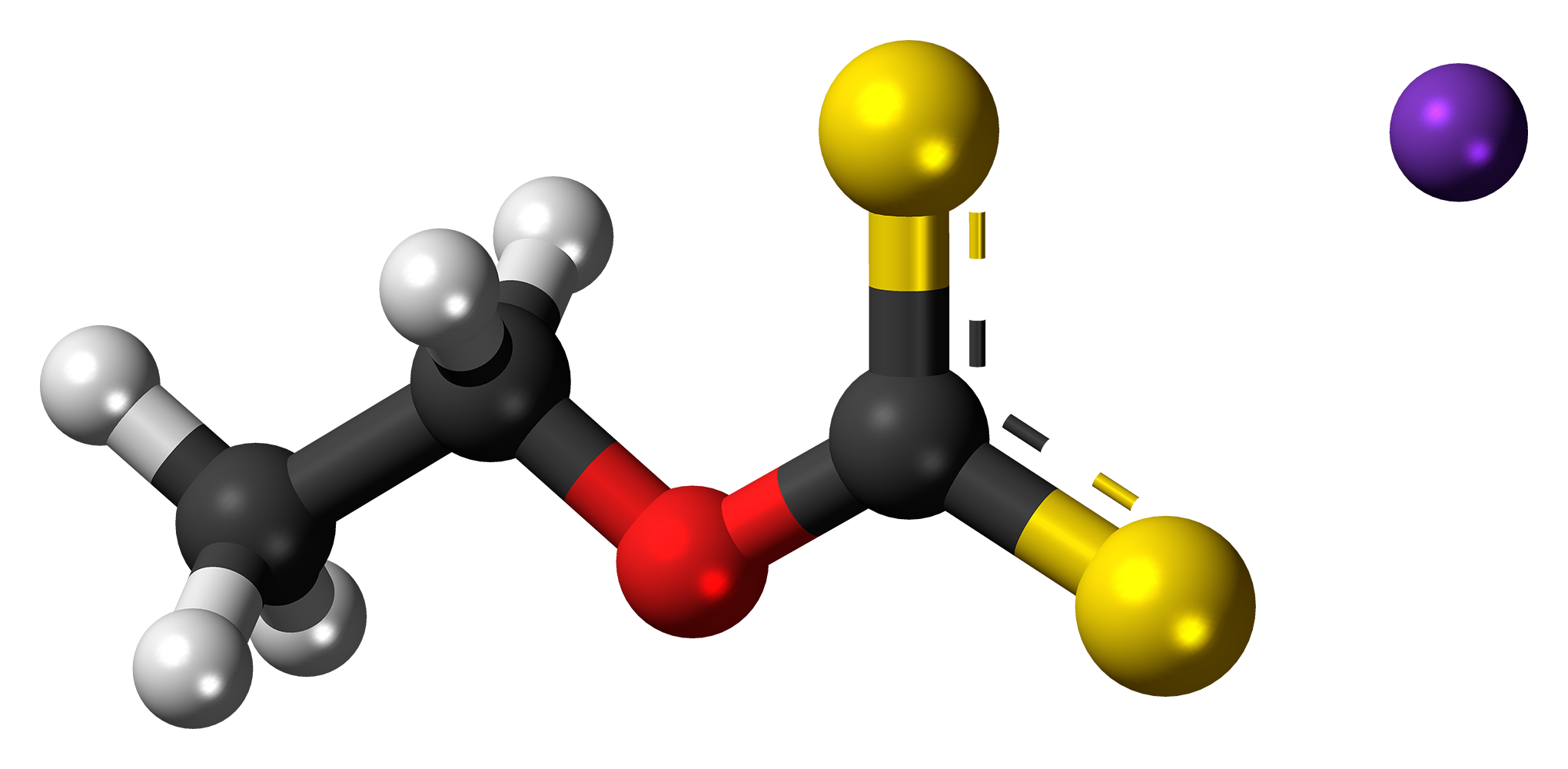

Names
- Preferred IUPAC name Potassium O-ethylcarbonodithioate
- Other names: Potassium ethylxanthogenate; Potassium ethylxanthate; Potassium-O-ethyl dithiocarbonate

Identifiers
| CAS Number | 140-89-6 |
| 3D model (JSmol) | Interactive image |
| ChEMBL | ChEMBL2380738 |
| ChemSpider | 8491 |
| ECHA InfoCard | 100.004.946 |
| EC Number | 205-439-3 |
| PubChem CID | 2735045 |
| UNII | 1A6K3Y576K |
| CompTox Dashboard (EPA) | DTXSID6042315 |
- InChI: InChI=1S/C3H6OS2.K/c1-2-4-3(5)6;/h2H2,1H3,(H,5,6);/q;+1/p-1 Key: JCBJVAJGLKENNC-UHFFFAOYSA-M; InChI=1S/C3H6OS2.K/c1-2-4-3(5)6;/h2H2,1H3,(H,5,6);/q;+1/p-1
- SMILES: [K+].[S-]C(=S)OCC

Properties
| Chemical formula | CH_{3}CH_{2}OCS_{2}K |
| Molar mass | 160.29 g·mol^{−1} |
| Appearance | Pale yellow powder |
| Density | 1.263 g/cm^{3} |
| Melting point | 225 to 226 °C (437 to 439 °F; 498 to 499 K) |
| Boiling point | decomposes |
| Acidity (pK_{a}) | approximately 1.6 |

Hazards
- GHS labelling
| Pictograms | (GHS02: Flammable) (GHS07: Exclamation mark) |
| Signal word | Warning |
| Hazard statements | H228, H302, H315, H319, H332, H335 |
| Precautionary statements | P210, P240, P241, P261, P264, P270, P271, P280, P301+P312, P302+P352, P304+P312, P304+P340, P305+P351+P338, P312, P321, P330, P332+P313, P337+P313, P362, P370+P378, P403+P233, P405, P501 |

Related compounds
| Other cations | Sodium ethyl xanthate |
- Except where otherwise noted, data are given for materials in their standard state (at 25 °C [77 °F], 100 kPa). verify (what is ?) Infobox references

Potassium ethyl xanthate (KEX, or PEX) is an organosulfur compound with the chemical formula CH_{3}CH_{2}OCS_{2}K. It is a pale yellow powder that is used in the mining industry for the separation of ores. It is a potassium salt of ethyl xanthic acid. Many xanthates are known.

== Production and properties ==
Xanthate salts are prepared by the action of alkoxides on carbon disulfide. The alkoxide is often generated in situ from potassium hydroxide:

CH_{3}CH_{2}OH + CS_{2} + KOH → CH_{3}CH_{2}OCS_{2}K + H_{2}O

The salt KS_{2}COC_{5}H_{11}, prepared from potassium pentanolate and carbon disulfide, has been characterized by X-ray crystallography. The COCS_{2} portion of the anion is planar. The C-S bond lengths are both 1.65 Å, and the C-O distance is 1.38 Å.

Potassium ethyl xanthate is a pale yellow powder that is stable at high pH, but rapidly hydrolyses below pH = 9:

CH_{3}CH_{2}OCS_{2}K + H^{+} → CH_{3}CH_{2}OH + CS_{2} + K^{+}

Oxidation of xanthate salts gives diethyl dixanthogen disulfide:

4 CH_{3}CH_{2}OCS_{2}K + 2 H_{2}O + O_{2} → 2 (CH_{3}CH_{2}OCS_{2})_{2} + 4 KOH

KEX is a source of ethylxanthate coordination complexes. For example, the octahedral complexes (CH_{3}CH_{2}OCS_{2})_{3}Cr, (CH_{3}CH_{2}OCS_{2})_{3}In, and (CH_{3}CH_{2}OCS_{2})_{3}Co have been prepared from KEX.

== Applications ==
Potassium ethyl xanthate is used in the mining industry as a flotation agent for the extraction of the ores of copper, nickel, and silver. The method exploits the affinity of these "soft" metals for the organosulfur ligand.

Potassium ethyl xanthate is a useful reagent for preparing xanthate esters from alkyl and aryl halides. The resulting xanthate esters are useful intermediates in organic synthesis.

== Safety ==
The LD_{50} is 103 mg/kg (oral, rats) for potassium ethyl xanthate.
