= Xanthate =

Salt that is a metal-thioate/O-esters of dithiocarbonate

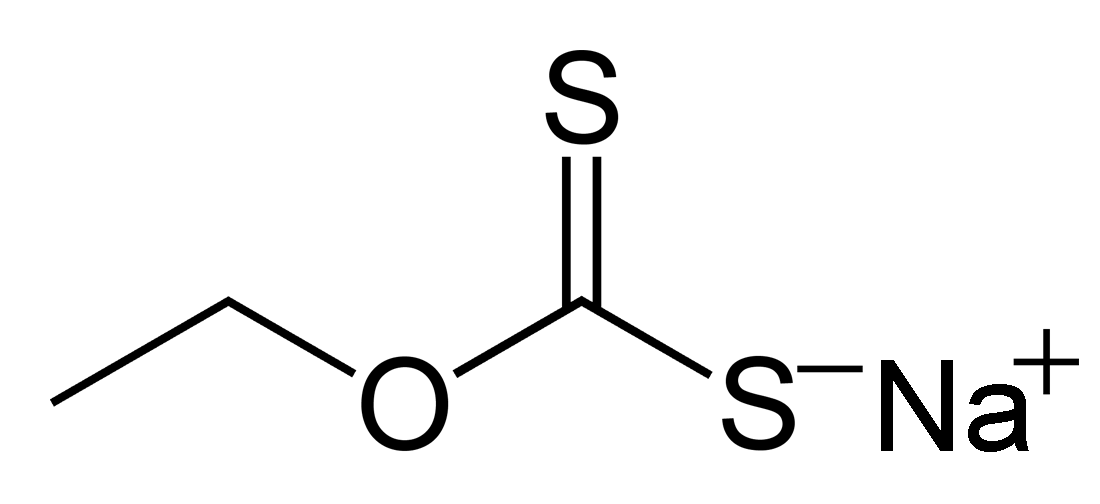
Sodium salt of ethyl xanthate (sodium ethylxanthate or sodium O-ethyl dithiocarbonate)

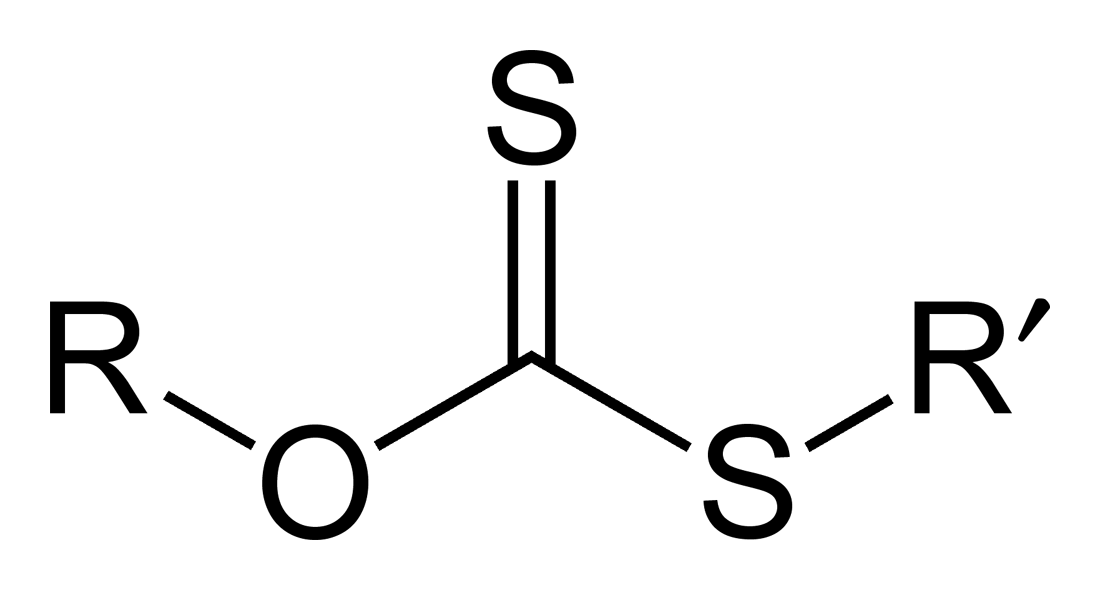
Structure of a xanthate ester

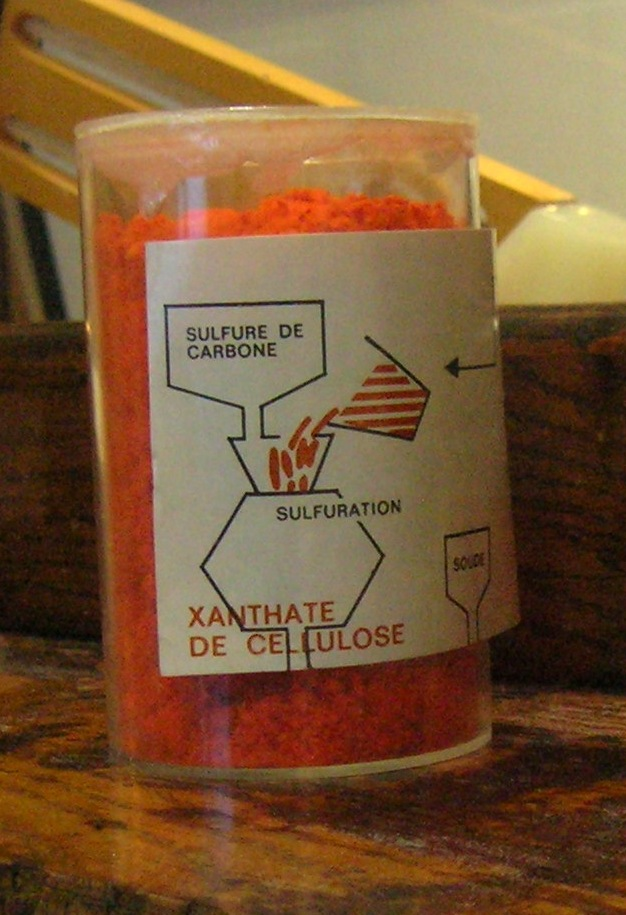
Cellulose xanthate.

A xanthate is a salt or ester of a xanthic acid. The formula of the salt of xanthic acid is [R−O−CS_{2}]^{−}M^{+} (where R is organyl group and M is usually Na or K). Xanthate also refers to the anion [R−O−CS_{2}]^{−}. The formula of a xanthic acid is R−O−C(=S)−S−H, such as ethyl xanthic acid, while the formula of a xanthate ester is R−O−C(=S)−S−R', where R and R' are organyl groups. The salts of xanthates are sometimes called O-organyl dithioates. The esters of xanthic acid are sometimes called O,S-diorganyl esters of dithiocarbonic acid. The name xanthate is derived from Ancient Greek ξανθός (xanthos) meaning 'yellowish' or 'golden', and indeed most xanthate salts are yellow. They were discovered and named in 1823 by Danish chemist William Christopher Zeise. These organosulfur compounds are important in two areas: the production of cellophane and related polymers from cellulose and (in mining) for extraction of certain sulphide bearing ores. They are also versatile intermediates in organic synthesis.

== Formation and structure ==
Xanthate salts of alkali metals are produced by the treatment of an alcohol, alkali, and carbon disulfide. The process is called xanthation. In chemical terminology, the alkali reacts with the alcohol to produce an alkoxide, which is the nucleophile that adds to the electrophilic carbon atom in CS_{2}. Often the alkoxide is generated in situ by treating the alcohol with sodium hydroxide or potassium hydroxide:

ROH + CS_{2} + KOH → ROCS_{2}K + H_{2}O

For example, sodium ethoxide gives sodium ethyl xanthate. Many alcohols can be used in this reaction. Technical grade xanthate salts are usually of 90–95% purity. Impurities include alkali metal sulfides, sulfates, trithiocarbonates, thiosulfates, sulfites, or carbonates as well as residual raw material such as alcohol and alkali hydroxide. These salts are available commercially as powder, granules, flakes, sticks, and solutions are available.

Some commercially or otherwise useful xanthate salts include:

- sodium ethyl xanthate CH_{3}CH_{2}OCS_{2}Na
- potassium ethyl xanthate, CH_{3}CH_{2}OCS_{2}K
- potassium isopropyl xanthate, (CH_{3})_{2}CHOCS_{2}K
- sodium isobutyl xanthate, (CH_{3})_{2}CHCH_{2}OCS_{2}Na
- potassium amyl xanthate, CH_{3}(CH_{2})_{4}OCS_{2}K

The OCS_{2} core of xanthate salts and esters, like that of the carbonates and the esters has trigonal planar molecular geometry. The central carbon atom is sp^{2}-hybridized. The potassium salt of the amyl xanthate (KS_{2}COC_{5}H_{11}) has been characterized by X-ray crystallography. The COCS_{2} portion of the anion is planar. The C-S bond lengths are both 1.65 Å, and the C-O distance is 1.38 Å.

== Reactions ==
=== Acid-base properties ===
Xanthic acids, with the formula ROC(S)SH, can be prepared by treating alkali metal xanthates, e.g. potassium ethyl xanthate, with hydrochloric acid at low temperatures. The methyl and ethyl xanthic acids are oils that are soluble in organic solvents. Benzyl xanthic acid is a solid. They have pKas near 2. These compounds thermally decompose in the presence of base to the alcohol and carbon disulfide.

Xanthic acids characteristically decompose:

ROCS_{2}K + HCl → ROH + CS_{2} + KCl

This reaction is the reverse of the method for the preparation of the xanthate salts. The intermediate in the decomposition is the xanthic acid, ROC(S)SH, which can be isolated in certain cases.

=== Cleavage of C-O bonds ===
The C-O bond in xanthate esters can be cleaved in various ways, providing a means for deoxygenation of alcohols. In Barton–McCombie deoxygenation, tributyltin hydride is the source of H atom. Several variations of this deoxygenation are known, for example using AIBN and hydrosilanes.

Xanthates are intermediates in the Chugaev elimination process. They can be used to control radical polymerisation under the RAFT process, also termed MADIX (macromolecular design via interchange of xanthates).

=== Reactions with electrophiles ===
Xanthate anions undergo alkylation to give xanthate esters, which are generally stable:

ROCS_{2}K + R′X → ROC(S)SR′ + KX

They can be oxidized to dixanthogen disulfides:

2 ROCS_{2}Na + I_{2} → ROC(S)S_{2}C(S)OR + 2 NaI

Acylation of xanthates gives alkyl xanthogen esters (ROC(S)SC(O)R') and related anhydrides.

Xanthates bind to transition metal cations as bidentate ligands. The charge-neutral complexes are soluble in organic solvents.

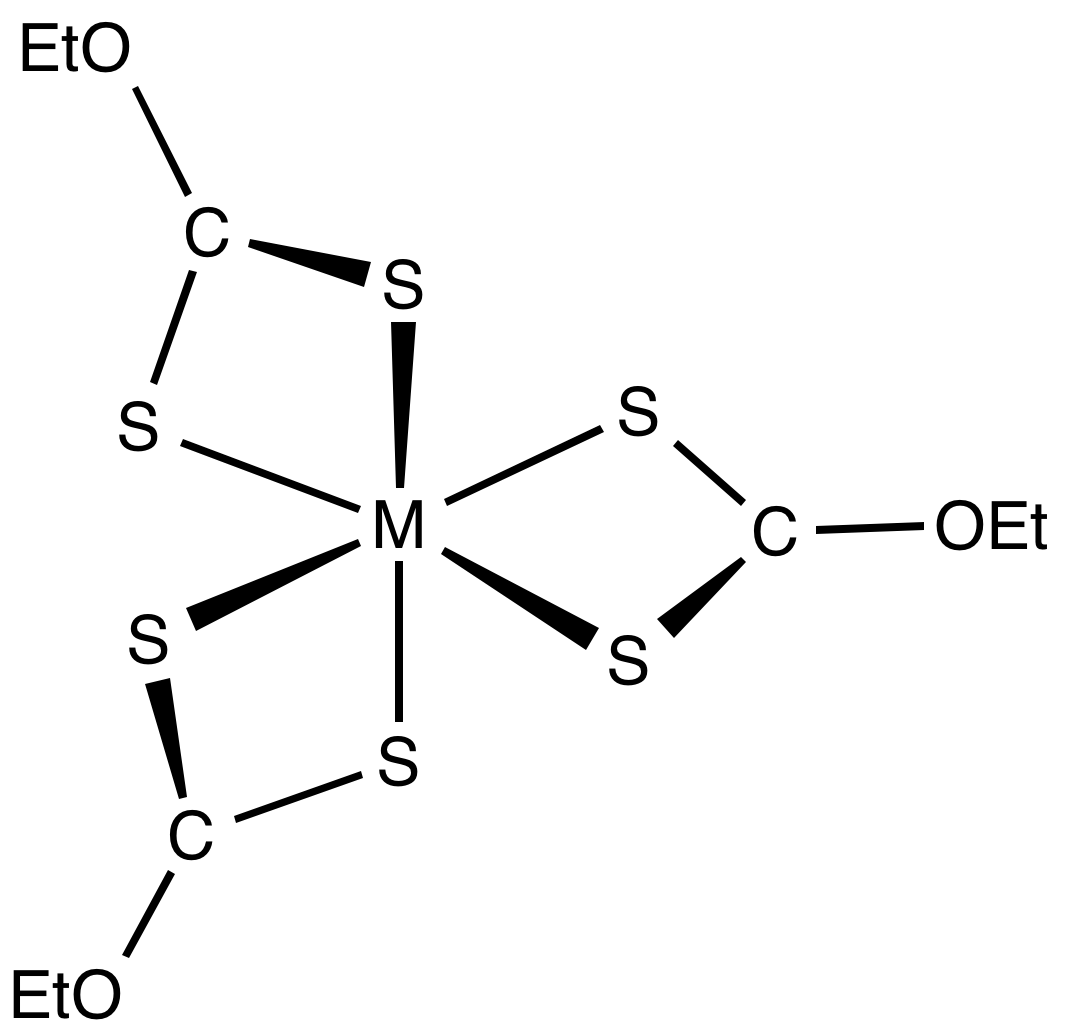
Structure of typical metal tris(ethylxanthate) complex.

== Industrial applications ==
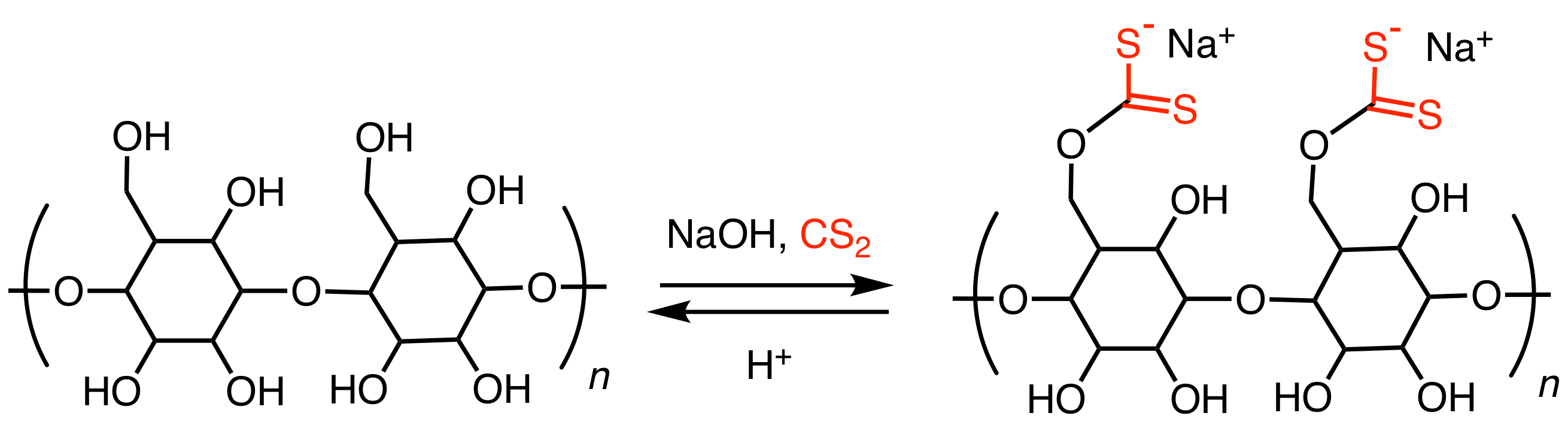
Simplified image of xanthation of cellulose.

Cellulose reacts with carbon disulfide (CS_{2}) in presence of sodium hydroxide (NaOH) to produces sodium cellulose xanthate, which upon neutralization with sulfuric acid (H_{2}SO_{4}) gives viscose rayon or cellophane paper (Sellotape or Scotch Tape).

Xanthate salts (e.g. sodium alkyl xanthates, dixanthogen) are widely used as flotation agents in mineral processing.

== Related compounds ==
Rarely encountered, thioxanthates arise by the reaction of CS_{2} with thiolate salts. For example, sodium ethylthioxanthate has the formula C_{2}H_{5}SCS_{2}Na. Dithiocarbamates are also related compounds. They arise from the reaction of a secondary amine with CS_{2}. For example, sodium diethyldithiocarbamate has the formula (C_{2}H_{5})_{2}NCS_{2}Na.

== Environmental impacts ==
While biodegradable, this class of chemicals may be toxic to life in water at concentrations of less than 1 mg/L. Water downstream of mining operations is often contaminated with xanthates.
