= Minerals Separation, Ltd. v. Hyde =

Minerals Separation v. Hyde
- Supreme Court of the United States

Argued October 27, 30–31, November 1, 1916 Decided December 11, 1916
- Full case name: Minerals Separation, Limited, and Minerals Separation American Syndicate, Limited, v. James M. Hyde
- Citations: 242 U.S. 261 (more) 37 S. Ct. 82; 61 L. Ed. 286; 1916 U.S. LEXIS 1517

Court membership
- Chief Justice Edward D. White Associate Justices Joseph McKenna · Oliver W. Holmes Jr. William R. Day · Willis Van Devanter; Mahlon Pitney · James C. McReynolds; Louis Brandeis · John H. Clarke

Case opinion
- Majority: Clarke, joined by unanimous

Minerals Separation v. Hyde, 242 U.S. 261 (1916), is a United States Supreme Court case on the patent protection of froth flotation.

== Background ==
U.S. Patent No. 835,120, issued on November 6, 1906, was granted to Henry Livingston Sulman, Hugh Fitzalis Kirkpatrick-Picard and John Ballot. The assignee of the patent was Minerals Separation, Limited. As stated in the specification of the patent, the claimed discovery related "to improvements in the process for the concentration of ores, the object being to separate metalliferous matter from gangue by means of oils, fatty acids, or other substances which have a preferential affinity for such metalliferous matter over gangue."

James M. Hyde, a former employee of Minerals Separation, Limited, was hired by the owners of the Butte and Superior Copper Company and built a successful, small test plant in 1911. In 1912, he designed and the company built the Butte & Superior works, Butte, Montana, the first great froth flotation mill in the United States, using what he called the 'Hyde Process'. Minerals Separation claimed that its patent had been infringed, which eventually led to the matter going to the Supreme Court in the case, Minerals Separation v. Hyde.

Prior to the discovery, it was well known that oil and oily substances had a selective affinity or attraction for, and would unite mechanically with, the minute particles of metal and metallic compounds found in crushed or powdered ores, but would not so unite with the quartz, or rocky nonmetallic material, called "gangue". It was also well known that this selective property of oils and oily substances was increased when applied to some ores by the addition of a small amount of acid to the ore and water used in process of concentration.

A flotation process using oil had been patented, in Britain in 1902, and in the US in 1903. It was US patent No. 777,273, granted to Arthur E. Cattermole, using an amount of oil varying from four percent. to six per cent. of the weight of metalliferous matter present. Cattermole held another related patent No. 772,274. John Ballot acquired the Cattermole process patents, while preparing to form the company Minerals Separation, Limited. There followed work in the London laboratories of the company, to improve the operation of the hitherto impractical Cattermole process. The discovery was made that, by reducing the amount of oil to 'a fraction of 1%', the effectiveness of the process improved markedly.

The evidence of an expert, Adolph Liebmann, (11) was quoted in the judgement of Minerals Separation v. Hyde: " 'The present invention differs essentially from all previous results. It is true that oil is one of the substances used, but it is used in quantities much smaller than was ever heard of, and it produces a result never obtained before. The minerals are obtained in a froth of a peculiar character, consisting of air bubbles which, in their covering film, have the minerals embedded in such manner that they form a complete surface all over the bubbles. A remarkable fact with regard to this froth is that, although the very light and easily destructible air bubbles are covered with a heavy mineral, yet the froth is stable and utterly different from any froth known before, being so permanent in character that I have personally seen it stand for twenty-four hours without any change having taken place. The simplicity of the operation, as compared with the prior attempts, is startling. All that has to be done is to add a minute quantity of oil to the pulp, to which acid may or may not be added, agitate for from two and one half to ten minutes, and then, after a few seconds, collect from the surface the froth, which will contain a large percentage of the minerals present in the ore.' " (12)

The plaintiffs in the suit had 'turned failure into success' (18), by their invention, but various aspects of their patent rested upon the existing work of others.

== Judgement ==
The court found, "The evidence of infringement is clear" (17), but also that, "While we thus find in favor of the validity of the patent, we cannot agree with the district court in regarding it valid as to all of the claims in suit." (18) It found that "the patent must be confined to the results obtained by the use of oil within the proportions often described in the testimony and in the claims of the patent as 'critical proportions,' 'amounting to a fraction of 1 per cent on the ore' " (18)

The case established a principle of patent law that, “the certainty which the law requires in patents is not greater than is reasonable, having regard to their subject-matter”(16), which has been cited in other judgements.

== Aftermath ==
A disclaimer was added to the patent, disclaiming claims 9, 10, and 11, in accordance with the judgement..

According to Herbert Hoover, Minerals Separation levied an average royalty of 1 shilling or 25 cents per ton to the users of its patent. Minerals Separation made other lawsuits against parties attempting to apply froth flotation, without its involvement, "and in so doing earned for itself the cordial detestation of many in the mining world". Further animosity was created, when Minerals Separation claimed royalties for treatment of ore that they themselves had declared unsuited to flotation. Some mining companies had persisted and eventually made flotation work with such ores—without significant assistance from Minerals Separation—but still found themselves expected to pay royalties. Larger companies, such as Anaconda and Inspiration, were able to negotiate lower rates of royalties. Minerals Separation also required binding contracts, on metallurgists employed by licensees of their patent, prohibiting any disclosure concerning the process. The patent expired in 1923.
