= Dithiofluorescein =

Names
- IUPAC name 3′,6′-Bis(sulfanyl)spiro[2-benzofuran-3,9′-xanthene]-1-one
- Other names: 3′,6′-Dimercaptofluoran; 3′,6′-Dimercaptospiro[isobenzofuran-1(3H),9′-[9H]xanthen]-3-one; 3′,6′-Dimercapto-3H-spiro[isobenzofuran-1,9′-xanthen]-3-one; Thiofluorescein

Identifiers
CAS Number	25319-73-7
3D model (JSmol)	Interactive image
ChemSpider	82528
EC Number	246-830-9
PubChem CID	91396
CompTox Dashboard (EPA)	DTXSID3067079
- InChI: InChI=1S/C20H12O3S2/c21-19-13-3-1-2-4-14(13)20(23-19)15-7-5-11(24)9-17(15)22-18-10-12(25)6-8-16(18)20/h1-10,24-25H Key: QOMSORNLFVSVPW-UHFFFAOYSA-N
- SMILES: C1=CC=C2C(=C1)C(=O)OC23C4=C(C=C(C=C4)S)OC5=C3C=CC(=C5)S

Properties
Chemical formula	C_{20}H_{12}O_{3}S_{2}
Molar mass	364.43 g·mol^{−1}
- Except where otherwise noted, data are given for materials in their standard state (at 25 °C [77 °F], 100 kPa). Infobox references

Dithiofluorescein (sometimes generically called thiofluorescein) is a complexometric indicator used in analytical chemistry. It changes from blue to colorless when it binds to mercury(2+) ions. It thus can indicate the endpoint in the titration of thiols using o-hydroxymercuribenzoic acid or its sodium salt. The reagent can be immobilized t in a polymer on a fiber optic, which might allow development of a detector for sulfide ions in a flow cell. Unlike fluorescein and other related fluoran dyes that have oxygen substituents on the benzene rings, dithiofluorescein, which has sulfur substituents, is not fluorescent.
