= Thiocarbanilide =

- Thiocarbanilide

Names
- Preferred IUPAC name N,N′-Diphenylthiourea
- Other names 1,3-Diphenylthiourea sym-Diphenylthiourea; Diphenylthiourea; 1,3-Diphenyl-2-thiourea; DPTU; Sulfocarbanilide

Identifiers
CAS Number	102-08-9
3D model (JSmol)	Interactive image
ChEMBL	ChEMBL275260
ChemSpider	610932
ECHA InfoCard	100.002.732
PubChem CID	700999
UNII	9YCB5VR86Z
CompTox Dashboard (EPA)	DTXSID4026139
- InChI: InChI=1S/C13H12N2S/c16-13(14-11-7-3-1-4-8-11)15-12-9-5-2-6-10-12/h1-10H,(H2,14,15,16) Key: FCSHMCFRCYZTRQ-UHFFFAOYSA-N; InChI=1/C13H12N2S/c16-13(14-11-7-3-1-4-8-11)15-12-9-5-2-6-10-12/h1-10H,(H2,14,15,16) Key: FCSHMCFRCYZTRQ-UHFFFAOYAC
- SMILES: S=C(Nc1ccccc1)Nc2ccccc2

Properties
Chemical formula	C_{13}H_{12}N_{2}S
Molar mass	228.312 g/mol
Appearance	White powder
Density	1.32 g/cm^{3}
Melting point	154.5 °C (310.1 °F; 427.6 K)
Boiling point	decomposes
Solubility in water	slightly soluble in water
Solubility	very soluble in ethanol, diethyl ether, chloroform

Hazards
NFPA 704 (fire diamond)	2 1 0
Flash point	164.7 °C (328.5 °F; 437.8 K)
- Except where otherwise noted, data are given for materials in their standard state (at 25 °C [77 °F], 100 kPa). verify (what is ?) Infobox references

Thiocarbanilide is an organic chemical compound with the formula (C_{6}H_{5}NH)_{2}CS. This white solid is a derivative of thiourea. It is prepared by the reaction of aniline and carbon disulfide.

== Uses ==
Thiocarbanilide is commonly used as a vulcanization accelerator for rubber, and as a stabilizer for PVC and PVDC. Its use as a vulcanization accelerator was discovered by BF Goodrich chemist George Oenslager.

== Reactions ==
Thiocarbanilide reacts with phosphorus pentachloride, phosphorus pentoxide, acetic anhydride, and other reagent to produce phenyl isothiocyanate.

== Toxicology ==
Oral, rat: LD_{50} = 50 mg/kg.
