= A. D. Carmichael =

Scottish chemist and mining engineer

Archibald Drummond Carmichael (24 February 1859 – 14 November 1915) was a Scottish industrial chemist and mining engineer who made important advances in processing mine tailings to recover valuable metals.

== History ==
Carmichael was born in Lanarkshire, Scotland, and educated in Glasgow. He studied chemistry under Professor Dittmer at the Andersonian College ("The Place of Useful Learning"), and gained experience at city analysts Wallace, Tatlack, and Clarke. He worked at Charles Tennant's "St Rollox" laboratories adjacent the Monkland Canal for 14 years, rising to the level of chief technical chemist.

In 1889 left for Victoria, Australia, where he found employment with Felton, Grimwade & Co and with the Australian Explosives and Chemical Company.

He joined the Metals Extraction Company, and was sent to Broken Hill with metallurgist Askin Nicholas to troubleshoot one of Junction North mine's processes. In 1894 he joined Broken Hill's Block 10 Company as assayer, then in October 1896 joined "The Proprietary" (BHP). Around this time he began experimenting with ways of converting refractory zinc sulphide to the oxide.

In 1901, he worked with Leslie Bradford in developing the Carmichael–Bradford desulphurisation process for conversion of sulphide ores to their oxides prior to smelting, which enabled recovery of valuable metal from the great piles of tailings at the mines, and the manufacture of sulphuric acid, leading to the founding of the Zinc Corporation.

They floated the Carmichael-Bradford Desulphurising Co. in 1908 to manage international patents; apart from BHP little interest was shown and the company was wound up in 1912.

Carmichael immigrated to the United States in 1914 with his wife, Rosa. He died the following year at his home in New York City after a sudden bout of acute indigestion.
