= Asia-Pacific Journal of Chemical Engineering =

- Discipline: Chemistry
- Language: English
- Edited by: Moses O. Tadé

Publication details
- Former name(s): Developments in Chemical Engineering and Mineral Processing
- History: 1993–present
- Publisher: John Wiley & Sons
- Frequency: Bimonthly
- Impact factor: 1.447 (2020)

Standard abbreviations
- ISO 4: Asia-Pac. J. Chem. Eng.

Indexing
- CODEN: AJCEBK
- ISSN: 1932-2135 (print); 1932-2143 (web)

Links
- Journal homepage

The Asia-Pacific Journal of Chemical Engineering is a peer-reviewed scientific journal published by John Wiley & Sons on behalf of Curtin University of Technology. Until 2006 it was known as Developments in Chemical Engineering and Mineral Processing and published (in print only) by Curtin University of Technology. The current editor-in-chief is Moses O. Tadé (Curtin University of Technology).

== Most cited papers ==
The three most-cited papers published by the journal are:

1. Research Article: Development of a novel autothermal reforming process and its economics for clean hydrogen production, Volume 1, Issue 1–2, Nov-Dec 2006, Pages: 5–12, Chen ZX, Elnashaie SSEH
2. Research Article: Review: examining the use of different feedstock for the production of biodiesel, Volume 2, Issue 5, Sep-Oct 2007, Pages: 480–486, Behzadi S, Farid MM
3. Research Article: The forces at work in colloidal self-assembly: a review on fundamental interactions between colloidal particles, Volume 3, Issue 3, May-Jun 2008, Pages: 255–268, Li Q, Jonas U, Zhao XS, et al.
