= Leslie Bradford =

Leslie Bradford (9 March 1878 – 20 June 1943) was a mining engineer in Australia credited with several important inventions in the treatment of metal-bearing ores.

== History ==
Born in Delhi, India, Bradford was youngest of seven children of George A. Bradford, Minister of Salt in the Indian Government, and was educated at Bishop Cotton's school. In 1892 he moved with his parents to Adelaide, South Australia, where he studied for four years at the School of Mines, and was their youngest student to gain diplomas for mining, metallurgy, and chemistry. In 1897 he gained employment with the Block 14 Company of Broken Hill as assistant assayer, and the following year was put in charge of that section. In 1898 he joined BHP at their treatment works in Port Pirie, and in 1899 was appointed their chief assayer and metallurgist.

While at Port Pirie he developed a process of separating sulphide ores by froth flotation, earlier investigated by G. D. Delprat and Charles Vincent Potter. Bradford's breakthrough was the use of copper sulphate to promote the process. In February 1919 he was granted a patent, and extended to Edward Horwood, Edwin Thomas Henderson, and the Broken Hill Proprietary a percentage of royalties received. In 1928 his patent rights were conditionally extended a further five years. William Piper was involved in later developments, as were Sir Herbert Gepp and Auguste de Bavay.

In 1901 he began working with chemist A. D. Carmichael in developing the Carmichael-Bradford desulphurisation process for treatment of sulphide ores prior to smelting, which enabled recovery of valuable metal from the great piles of tailings at the mines, and led to the founding of the Zinc Corporation. Their company Carmichael–Bradford Desulphurising Co. was founded in 1908 to manage international patents; apart from BHP little interest was shown and the company was wound up in 1912.

In 1915 he was transferred to the company's Newcastle Steelworks where he worked on refinements to their open hearth furnaces.

Bradford resigned in 1920 to found with Ernest James Kendall the Bradford-Kendall steel foundry on Botany Road, Botany, New South Wales. He was lured back to BHP in 1924 to manage their steelworks, retaining his interest in the foundry.

He became General Manager of BHP in 1935 and Chief Executive Officer in 1938.

In 1940 he founded Bradford Insulation to exploit rockwool from the smelter's slag, which was otherwise wasted.

== Recognition ==
- A laboratory in the South Australian Institute of Technology (now University of South Australia) was named for him
- A portrait by Sir William Dargie is held by the University of Melbourne.
- He was awarded the Australasian Institute of Mining and Metallurgy bronze medal in 1938.

== Personal ==
Bradford died at his home, 2 Macquarie Road, Toorak, Victoria, after a long illness, survived by his wife, three sons, and twin daughters.

== Family ==
George Augustus Bradford (c. 1840 – 30 June 1917) married Amelia Caroline Moore (1842 – 1910) on 6 July 1867

- Miss M. M. C. Bradford (1868 – )
- Miss M. C. Bradford (1870 – 1944)
- Miss E. M. Bradford (1872 – 1942)
- Ashley Vere Bradford (1871 – 1 August 1936) never married
- H. M. Bradford (1874 – 1954) assistant manager, Broken Hill North
- F. C. Bradford (1876 – 1927) electrical engineer, BHAS, Port Pirie
- Leslie Bradford (9 March 1878 – 20 June 1943) married Mabel Ellen Müller (1879 – 1965) on 26 April 1902.

They had a home in Sussex Street, Glenelg
