= Ethyl xanthic acid =

Chemical compound

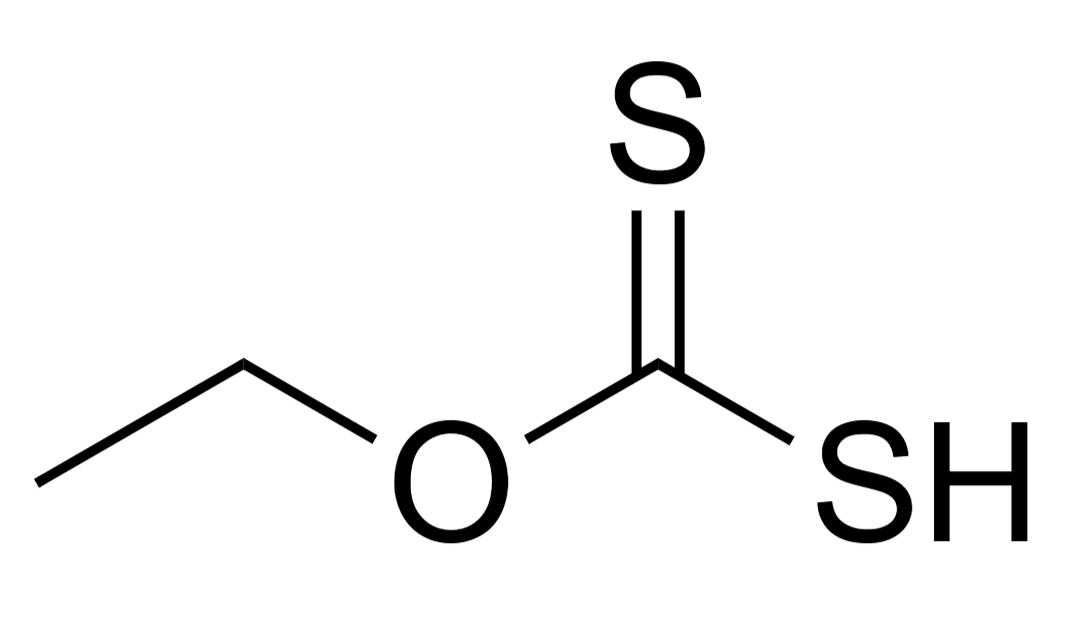

Names
- IUPAC name Ethoxymethanedithioic acid
- Other names: Carbonodithioic acid, O-ethyl ester; Ethyl xanthic acid; Ethylxanthate; Ethylxanthic acid; Ethylxanthogenic acid; O-Ethyl hydrogen carbonodithioate; O-Ethyl dithiocarbonic acid; Xanthogenic acid

Identifiers
CAS Number	151-01-9
3D model (JSmol)	Interactive image
ChEMBL	ChEMBL3039661
ChemSpider	8492
EC Number	205-780-8
PubChem CID	8823
UNII	B7B55M6MK1
- InChI: InChI=1S/C3H6OS2/c1-2-4-3(5)6/h2H2,1H3,(H,5,6)
- SMILES: CCOC(=S)S

Properties
Chemical formula	CH_{3}CH_{2}OCS_{2}H
Molar mass	122.20 g·mol^{−1}
Appearance	Colorless oily liquid
Melting point	−53 °C (−63 °F; 220 K)
Boiling point	Decomposes
Solubility in water	Slightly
Acidity (pK_{a})	1.6
- Except where otherwise noted, data are given for materials in their standard state (at 25 °C [77 °F], 100 kPa). Infobox references

Ethyl xanthic acid is an organic compound with the chemical formula CH_{3}CH_{2}−O−C(=S)−SH. It can be viewed as an O-ethyl ester of dithiocarbonic O,S-acid (the formula of that acid is S=C(OH)(SH)). Ethyl xanthic acid belongs to the category of thioacids, where the prefix thio- means that an oxygen atom in the compound is replaced by a sulfur atom.

== Preparation ==
Ethyl xanthic acid is obtained by the action of dilute sulfuric acid on potassium ethyl xanthate at 0 °C.

Ethyl xanthic acid is a colorless, labile oil. In aqueous solution, it decomposes rapidly by a unimolecular pathway to give carbon disulfide and ethanol.

== Esters of ethyl xanthic acid ==
The methyl and ethyl esters of ethyl xanthic acid are colorless, oily liquids with a penetrating odor.

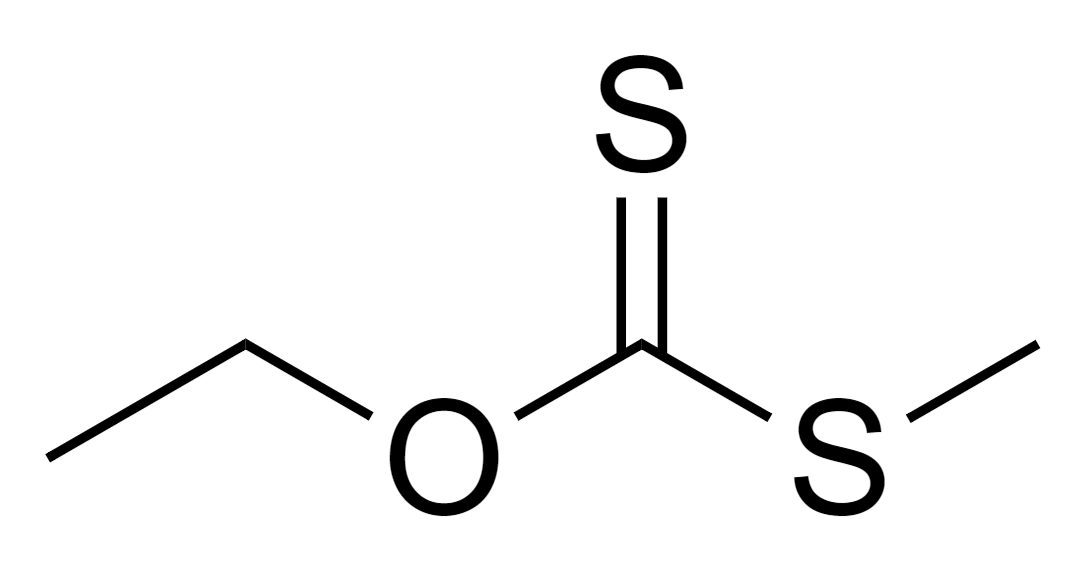
Methyl ethylxanthate or O-ethyl S-methyl dithiocarbonate, a methyl ester of ethyl xanthic acid

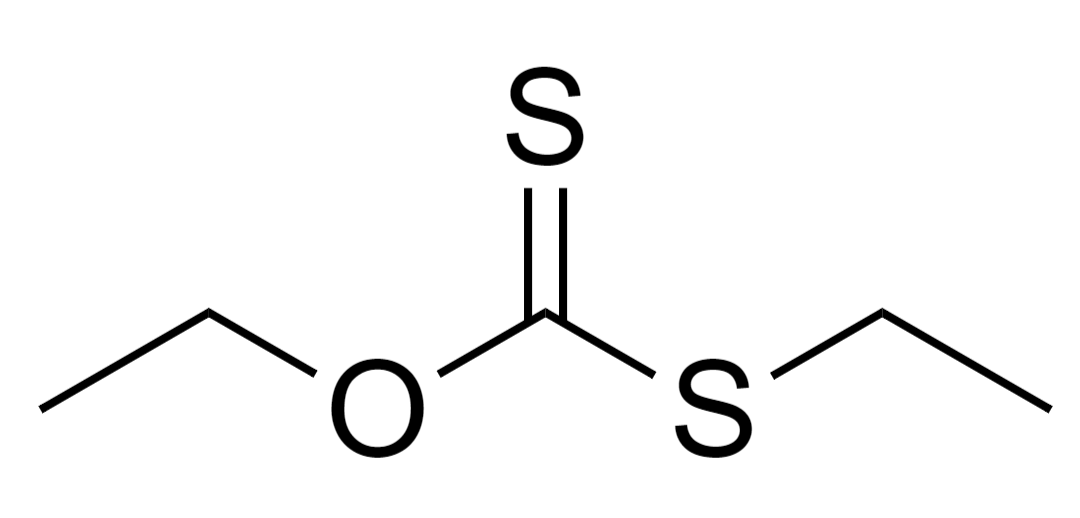
Ethyl ethylxanthate or O,S-diethyl dithiocarbonate, an ethyl ester of ethyl xanthic acid

== Reactions ==
Ethyl xanthic acid reacts with water or moisture producing carbon disulfide.

== Safety ==
In an experiment with white rats, chronically exposed rats by inhalation of ethyl xanthic acid revealed higher frequency of chromosomal rearrangements in lymphocytes of peripheral blood than the control rats.
