= Froth flotation =

Process for selectively separating of hydrophobic materials from hydrophilic

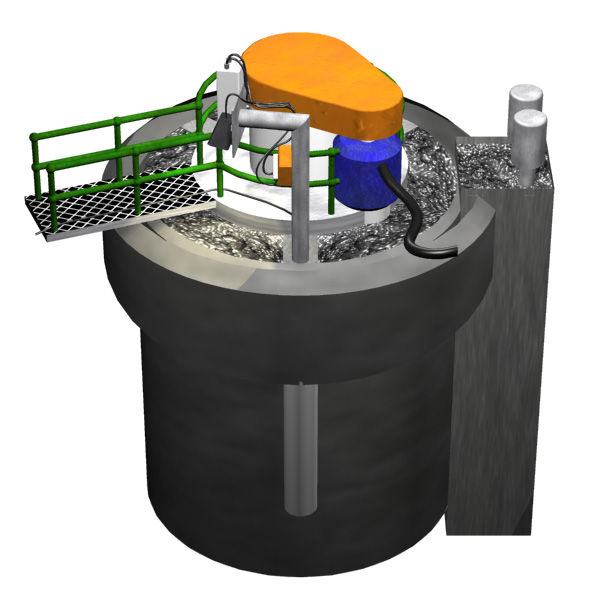
Diagram of a cylindrical flotation cell with camera and light used in image analysis of the froth surface.

Froth flotation is a process for selectively separating hydrophobic materials from hydrophilic. This is used in mineral processing, paper recycling and waste-water treatment industries. Historically this was first used in the mining industry, where it was one of the great enabling technologies of the 20th century. It has been described as "the single most important operation used for the recovery and upgrading of sulfide ores". The development of froth flotation has improved the recovery of valuable minerals, such as copper- and lead-bearing minerals. Along with mechanized mining, it has allowed the economic recovery of valuable metals from much lower-grade ore than previously possible.

== Industries ==
Froth flotation is applied to a wide range of separations. An estimated one billion tons of materials are processed in this manner annually.

=== Mineral processing ===
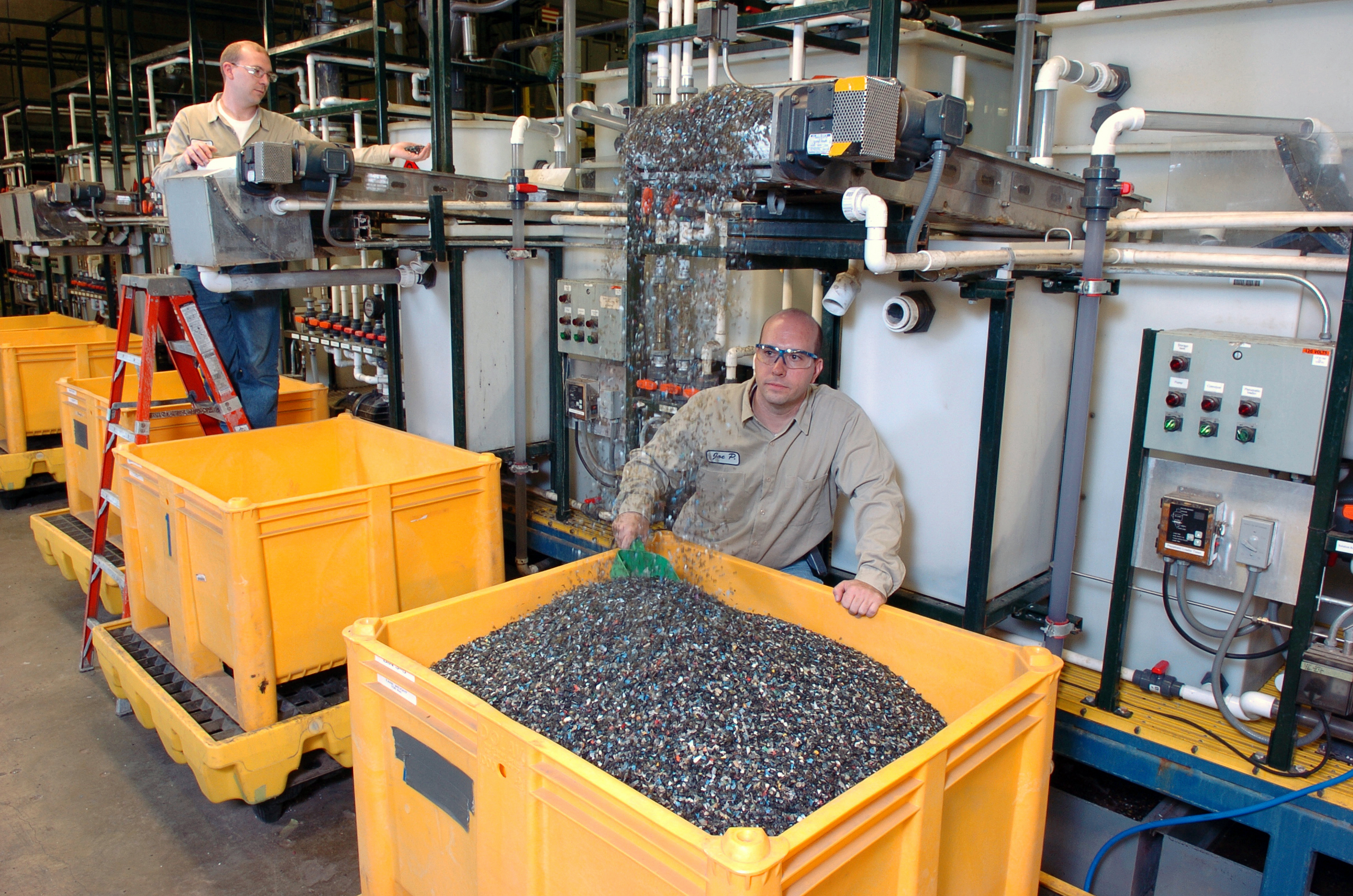
Froth flotation to separate plastics, Argonne National Laboratory

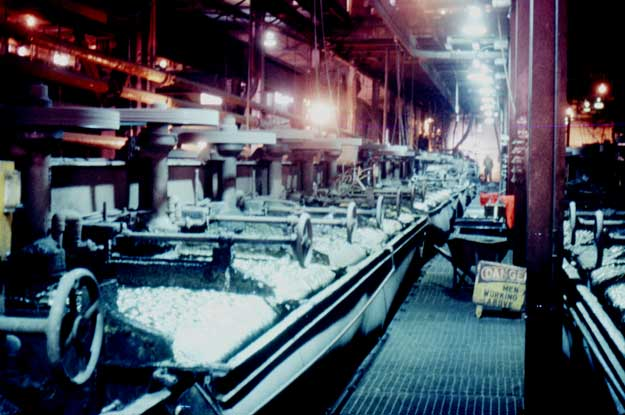
Froth flotation cells to concentrate copper and nickel sulfide minerals, Falconbridge, Ontario.

Froth flotation is a process for separating minerals from gangue by exploiting differences in their hydrophobicity. Hydrophobicity differences between valuable minerals and waste gangue are increased through the use of surfactants and wetting agents. The flotation process is used for the separation of a large range of sulfides, carbonates and oxides prior to further refinement. Phosphates and coal are also upgraded (purified) by flotation technology. "Grade-recovery curves" are tools for weighing the trade-off of producing a high grade of concentrate vs cost. These curves only compare the grade-recovery relations of a specific feed grade and feed rate.

=== Waste water treatment ===
Froth flotation has been demonstrated for the removal of microplastics from waste water.

The flotation process is also widely used in industrial waste water treatment plants, where it removes fats, oil, grease and suspended solids from waste water. These units are called dissolved air flotation (DAF) units. In particular, dissolved air flotation units are used in removing oil from the wastewater effluents of oil refineries, petrochemical and chemical plants, natural gas processing plants and similar industrial facilities.

== Principle of operation ==
The ore to be treated is ground into particles (comminution). In the idealized case, the individual minerals are physically separated, a process known as full liberation. The particles typically range in diameter from 2–500 micrometers. For froth flotation, an aqueous slurry of the ground ore is treated with the frothing agent. An example is sodium ethyl xanthate as a collector in the flotation of galena (lead sulfide) to separate it from sphalerite (zinc sulfide). The polar part of xanthate anion attaches to the ore particles and the non-polar hydrocarbon part forms a hydrophobic layer. The particles are brought to the water surface by air bubbles. About 300 g/t of ore is required for efficient separation. With increasing length of the hydrocarbon chain in xanthates, the efficiency of the hydrophobic action increases, but the selectivity to ore type decreases. The chain is shortest in sodium ethyl xanthate that makes it highly selective to copper, nickel, lead, gold, and zinc ores. Aqueous solutions (10%) with pH = 7–11 are normally used in the process. This slurry (more properly called the pulp) of hydrophobic particles and hydrophilic particles is then introduced to tanks known as flotation cells that are aerated to produce bubbles. The hydrophobic particles attach to the air bubbles, which rise to the surface, forming a froth. The froth is skimmed from the cell, producing a concentrate ("conc") of the target mineral.

The minerals that do not float into the froth are referred to as the flotation tailings or flotation tails. These tailings may also be subjected to further stages of flotation to recover the valuable particles that did not float the first time. This is known as scavenging. The final tailings after scavenging are normally pumped for disposal as mine fill or to tailings disposal facilities for long-term storage.

Flotation is normally undertaken in several stages to maximize the recovery of the target mineral or minerals and the concentration of those minerals in the concentrate, while minimizing the energy input.

=== Flotation stages ===
The first stage is called roughing, which produces a rougher concentrate. The objective is to remove the maximum amount of the valuable mineral at as coarse a particle size as practical. Grinding costs energy. The goal is to release enough gangue from the valuable mineral to get a high recovery. Some concentrators use a preflotation step to remove low density impurities such as carbonaceous dust. The rougher concentrate is normally subjected to further stages of flotation to reject more of the undesirable minerals that also reported to the froth, in a process known as cleaning. The resulting material is often subject to further grinding (usually called regrinding). Regrinding is often undertaken in specialized regrind mills, such as the IsaMill. The rougher flotation step is often followed by a scavenger flotation step that is applied to the rougher tailings to further recover any of the target minerals.

== Science of flotation ==
To be effective on a given ore slurry, the collectors are chosen based upon their selective wetting of the types of particles to be separated. A good collector will adsorb, physically or chemically, with one of the types of particles. The wetting activity of a surfactant on a particle can in principle be quantified by measuring the contact angles of the liquid/bubble interface. Another important measure for attachment of bubbles to particles is induction time, the time required for the particle and bubble to rupture the thin film separating the particle and bubble. This rupturing is achieved by the surface forces between the particle and bubble.

The mechanisms for the bubble-particle attachment is complex but is viewed as consisting of three steps: collision, attachment, and detachment. The collision is achieved by particles being within the collision tube of a bubble and this is affected by the velocity of the bubble and radius of the bubble. The collision tube corresponds to the region in which a particle will collide with the bubble, with the perimeter of the collision tube corresponding to the grazing trajectory.

The attachment of the particle to the bubble is controlled by the induction time of the particle and bubble. The particle and bubble need to bind and this occurs if the time in which the particle and bubble are in contact with each other is larger than the required induction time. This induction time is affected by the fluid viscosity, particle and bubble size and the forces between the particle and bubbles.

The detachment of a particle and bubble occurs when the force exerted by the surface tension is exceeded by shear forces and gravitational forces. These forces are complex and vary within the cell. High shear will be experienced close to the impeller of a mechanical flotation cell and mostly gravitational force in the collection and cleaning zone of a flotation column.

Significant issues of entrainment of fine particles occurs as these particles experience low collision efficiencies as well as sliming and degradation of the particle surfaces. Coarse particles show a low recovery of the valuable mineral due to the low liberation and high detachment efficiencies.

== Flotation equipment ==
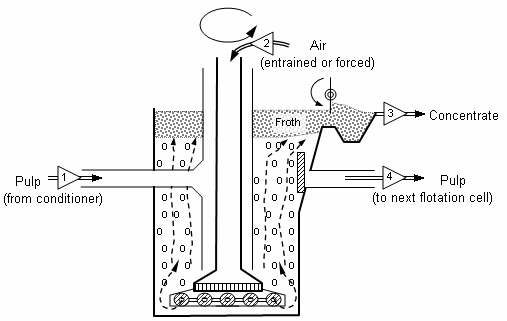
Diagram of froth flotation cell. Numbered triangles show direction of stream flow. A mixture of ore and water called pulp [1] enters the cell from a conditioner, and flows to the bottom of the cell. Air [2] or nitrogen is passed down a vertical impeller where shearing forces break the air stream into small bubbles. The mineral concentrate froth is collected from the top of the cell [3], while the pulp [4] flows to another cell.

Flotation can be performed in rectangular or cylindrical mechanically agitated cells or tanks, flotation columns, Jameson Cells or deinking flotation machines. Classified by the method of air absorption manner, it is fair to state that two distinct groups of flotation equipment have arisen:pneumatic and mechanical machines. Generally pneumatic machines give a low-grade concentrate and little operating troubles.

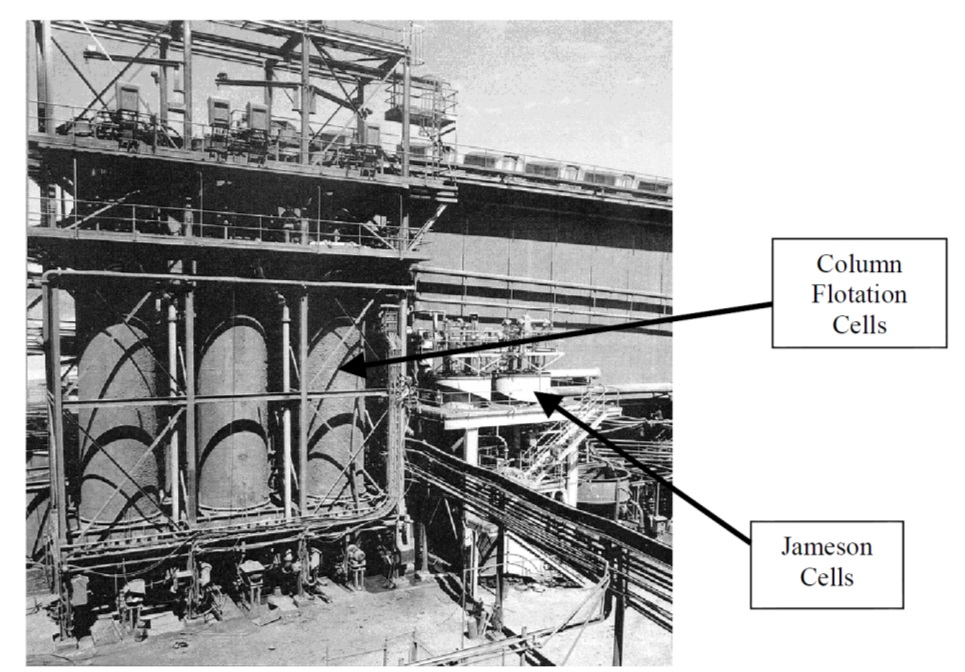
Comparison of the sizes of flotation columns and Jameson Cells with similar capacities.

Mechanical cells use a large mixer and diffuser mechanism at the bottom of the mixing tank to introduce air and provide mixing action. Flotation columns use air spargers to introduce air at the bottom of a tall column while introducing slurry above. The countercurrent motion of the slurry flowing down and the air flowing up provides mixing action. Mechanical cells generally have a higher throughput rate, but produce material that is of lower quality, while flotation columns generally have a low throughput rate but produce higher quality material.

The Jameson cell uses neither impellers nor spargers, instead combining the slurry with air in a downcomer where high shear creates the turbulent conditions required for bubble particle contacting.

== Chemicals of flotation ==
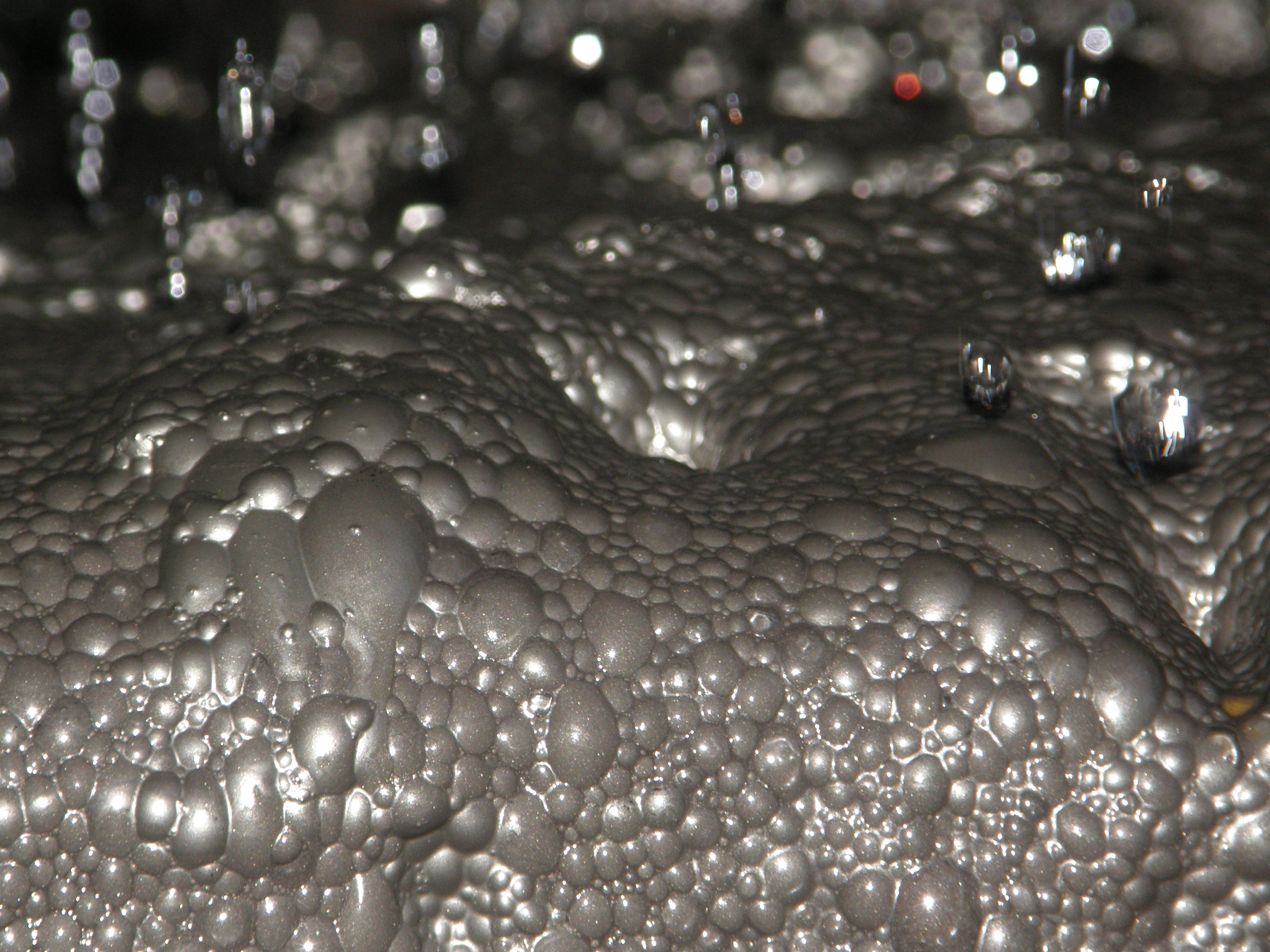
Copper sulfide foam in a froth-flotation cell

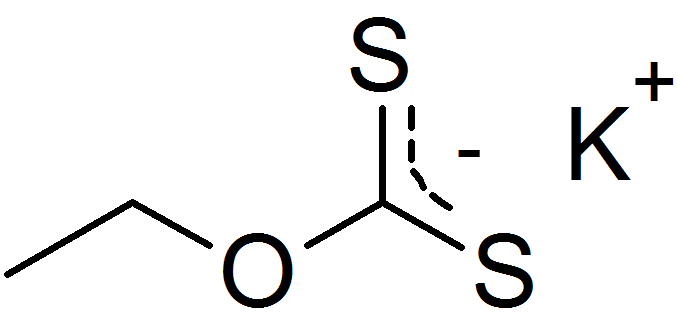
Potassium ethyl xanthate is a popular collector for sulfide minerals.

=== Collectors ===
For many ores (e.g. those of Cu, Mo, W, Ni), the collectors are anionic sulfur ligands. Particularly popular for sulfide minerals are xanthate salts, including potassium amyl xanthate (PAX), potassium isobutyl xanthate (PIBX), potassium ethyl xanthate (KEX), sodium isobutyl xanthate (SIBX), sodium isopropyl xanthate (SIPX), sodium ethyl xanthate (SEX). Related collectors include sulfur-based ligands such as organodithiophosphates. Still other classes of collectors include the thiourea thiocarbanilide. Fatty acid carboxylates, alkyl sulfates, and alkyl sulfonates have also been used for oxide minerals.

For some minerals (e.g., sylvinite for KCl), fatty amines are used as collectors.

=== Frothers ===
Additives are used to stabilize the foams. These include pine oil and various alcohols: methyl isobutyl carbinol (MIBC), polyglycols, xylenol (cresylic acid).

Unstable foam would coalesce too quickly and particles would fall off their surface. On the other hand, too stable foam complicates transportation and dewatering of the concentrate formed.

=== Depressants ===
According to one vendor, depressants "increase the efficiency of the flotation process by selectively inhibiting the interaction of one mineral with the collector." Thus a typical pulverized ore sample consists of many components, of which only one or a few are targets for the collector. Depressants bind to these other components, lest the collector be wasted by doing so. Depressants are selected for particular ores. Typical depressants are starch, polyphenols, lye, and lime. They are cheap, and oxygen-rich typically.

=== Modifiers ===
A variety of other compounds are added to optimize the separation process, these additives are called modifiers. Modifying reagents react either with the mineral surfaces or with collectors and other ions in the flotation pulp, resulting in a modified and controlled flotation response.

- pH modifiers include lime (used as quicklime CaO, or more commonly as slaked lime, a slurry of Ca(OH)_{2}), soda ash (Na_{2}CO_{3}), caustic soda (NaOH), sulfuric and hydrochloric acid (H_{2}SO_{4}, HCl).
- Anionic modifiers include phosphates, silicates, and carbonates.
- Organic modifiers include the thickeners dextrin, starch, glue, and carboxymethyl cellulose (CMC).

== Specific applications ==
=== Sulfide ores ===
Prior to 1907, nearly all the copper mined in the US came from underground vein deposits, averaging 2.5 percent copper. By 1991, the average grade of copper ore mined in the US had fallen to only 0.6 percent.

=== Nonsulfide ores ===
Flotation is used for the purification of potassium chloride from sodium chloride and clay minerals. The crushed mineral is suspended in brine in the presence of fatty ammonium salts. Because the ammonium head group and K^{+} have very similar ionic radii (ca. 0.135, 0.143 nm respectively), the ammonium centers exchange for the surface potassium sites on the particles of KCl, but not on the NaCl particles. The long alkyl chains then confer hydrophobicity to the particles, which enable them to form foams.

=== Chemical compounds for deinking of recycled paper ===
Froth flotation is one of the processes used to recover recycled paper. In the paper industry this step is called deinking or just flotation. The target is to release and remove the hydrophobic contaminants from the recycled paper. The contaminants are mostly printing ink and stickies. Normally the setup is a two-stage system with 3,4 or 5 flotation cells in series.

- pH control: sodium silicate and sodium hydroxide
- Calcium ion source: hard water, lime or calcium chloride
- Collector: fatty acid, fatty acid emulsion, fatty acid soap and/or organo-modified siloxane

== Environmental considerations ==
As in any technology that has long been conducted on the multi-million ton per year scale, flotation technologies have the potential to threaten the environment beyond the disruption caused by mining. Froth flotation employs a host of organic chemicals and relies upon elaborate machinery. Some of the chemicals (cyanide) are acutely toxic but hydrolyze to innocuous products. Naturally occurring fatty acids are widely used. Tailings and effluents are contained in lined ponds. Froth flotation is "poised for increased activity due to their potential usefulness in environmental site cleanup operations" including recycling of plastics and metals, not to mention water treatment.

Froth flotation also shows potential to recover valuable metals left in slag from mineral processing plants.

== History ==
Flotation processes are described in ancient Greek and Persian literature. During the late 19th century, the process basics were discovered through a slow evolutionary phase. During the first decade of the 20th century, a more rapid investigation of oils, froths, and agitation led to proven workplace applications, especially in Broken Hill, Australia, that brought the technological innovation known as “froth flotation.” During the early 20th century, froth flotation revolutionized mineral processing.

Initially, naturally occurring chemicals such as fatty acids and oils were used as flotation reagents in large quantities to increase the hydrophobicity of the valuable minerals. Since then, the process has been adapted and applied to a wide variety of materials to be separated, and additional collector agents, including surfactants and synthetic compounds have been adopted for various applications.

=== 19th century ===
Englishman William Haynes patented a process in 1860 for separating sulfide and gangue minerals using oil. Later writers have pointed to Haynes's as the first "bulk oil flotation" patent, though there is no evidence of its being field tested, or used commercially. In 1877 the brothers Bessel (Adolph and August) of Dresden, Germany, introduced their commercially successful oil and froth flotation process for extracting graphite, considered by some the root of froth flotation. However, the Bessel process became uneconomical after the discovery of high-grade graphite in Sri Lanka and was largely forgotten.

Inventor Hezekiah Bradford of Philadelphia invented a "method of saving floating material in ore-separation” and received US patent No. 345951 on July 20, 1886. He would later go on to patent the Bradford Breaker (US patent No. 143745), currently in use by the coal industry, in 1873. His "Bradford washer," patented 1870, was used to concentrate iron, copper and lead-zinc ores by specific gravity, but lost some of the metal as float off the concentration process. The 1886 patent was to capture this "float" using surface tension, the first of the skin-flotation process patents that were eclipsed by oil froth flotation.

On August 24, 1886, Carrie Everson received a patent for her process calling for oil[s] but also an acid or a salt, a significant step in the evolution of the process history. By 1890, tests of the Everson process had been made at Georgetown and Silver Cliff, Colorado, and Baker, Oregon. She abandoned the work upon the death of her husband, and before perfecting a commercially successful process. Later, during the height of legal disputes over the validity of various patents during the 1910s, Everson's was often pointed to as the initial flotation patent - which would have meant that the process was not patentable again by later contestants. Much confusion has been clarified recently by historian Dawn Bunyak.

=== First commercial flotation process ===
The generally recognized first successful commercial flotation process for mineral sulphides was invented by Frank Elmore who worked on the development with his brother, Stanley. The Glasdir copper mine at Llanelltyd, near Dolgellau in North Wales was bought in 1896 by the Elmore brothers in conjunction with their father, William. In 1897, the Elmore brothers installed the world's first industrial-size commercial flotation process for mineral beneficiation at the Glasdir mine. The process was not froth flotation but used oil to agglomerate (make balls of) pulverised sulphides and buoy them to the surface, and was patented in 1898 (revised 1901). The operation and process was described in the April 25, 1900 Transactions of the Institution of Mining and Metallurgy of England, which was reprinted with comment, June 23, 1900, in the Engineering and Mining Journal, New York City. By this time they had recognized the importance of air bubbles in assisting the oil to carry away the mineral particles. As modifications were made to improve the process, it became a success with base metal ores from Norway to Australia.

The Elmores had formed a company known as the Ore Concentration Syndicate Ltd to promote the commercial use of the process worldwide. In 1900, Charles Butters of Berkeley, California, acquired American rights to the Elmore process after seeing a demonstration at Llanelltyd, Wales. Butters, an expert on the cyanide process, built an Elmore process plant in the basement of the Dooley Building, Salt Lake City, and tested the oil process on gold ores throughout the region and tested the tailings of the Mammoth gold mill, Tintic district, Utah, but without success. Because of Butters' reputation and the news of his failure, as well as the unsuccessful attempt at the LeRoi gold mine at Rossland, B. C., the Elmore process was all but ignored in North America.

=== The development of froth flotation ===
Developments elsewhere, particularly in Broken Hill, Australia by Minerals Separation, Limited, led to decades of hard-fought legal battles and litigations (e. g. Minerals Separation, Ltd. v. Hyde). The Elmore process was superseded by more advanced techniques.

Another flotation process was independently invented in 1901 in Australia by Charles Vincent Potter and by Guillaume Daniel Delprat around the same time. Potter was a brewer of beer, as well as a chemist, and was likely inspired by the way beer froth lifted up sediment in the beer. This process did not use oil, but relied upon flotation by the generation of gas formed by the introduction of acid into the pulp. In 1903, Potter sued Delprat, then general manager of BHP, for patent infringement. He lost the case for reasons of utility, with Delpat arguing that while Potter's's process, which used sulphuric acid to generate the bubbles in the process, was not as useful as Delprat's process, which used salt cake. Despite this, after the case was over BHP began using sulphuric acid for its flotation process.

In 1902, Froment combined oil and gaseous flotation using a modification of the Potter-Delprat process. During the first decade of the twentieth century, Broken Hill became the center of innovation leading to the perfection of the froth flotation process by many technologists there borrowing from each other and building on these first successes.

Another process was developed in 1902 by Arthur C. Cattermole, who emulsified the pulp with a small quantity of oil, subjected it to violent agitation, and then slow stirring which coagulated the target minerals into nodules which were separated from the pulp by gravity. The Minerals Separation Ltd., formed in Britain in 1903 to acquire the Cattermole patent, found that it proved unsuccessful. Metallurgists on the staff continued to test and combine other discoveries to patent in 1905 their process, called the Sulman-Picard-Ballot process after company officers and patentees. The process proved successful at their Central Block plant, Broken Hill that year. Significant in their "agitation froth flotation" process was the use of less than 1% oil and an agitation step that created small bubbles, which provided more surface to capture the metal and float into a froth at the surface. Useful work was done by Leslie Bradford—granted an Australian patent in February 1919— and by William Piper, Sir Herbert Gepp and Auguste de Bavay.

Mineral Separation also bought other patents to consolidate ownership of any potential conflicting rights to the flotation process, except for the Elmore patents. In 1910, when the Zinc Corporation replaced its Elmore process with the Minerals Separation (Sulman-Picard-Ballot) froth flotation process at its Broken Hill plant, the primacy of the Minerals Separation over other process contenders was assured. Henry Livingston Sulman was later recognized by his peers in his election as President of the (British) Institution of Mining and Metallurgy, which also awarded him its gold medal.

In 1913, Mineral Separation acquired the patent for a differential flotation process, capable of reliably separating lead and zinc sulphide ores, held by Fleury James (Jim) Lyster (1872–1948), who perfected the technique, at the Broken Hill plant of Zinc Corporation.

=== 20th century ===
Developments in the United States had been less than spectacular. Butters's failures, as well as others, was followed after 1904, with Scotsman Stanley MacQuisten's process (a surface tension based method), which was developed with a modicum of success in Nevada and Idaho, but this would not work when slimes were present, a major fault. Henry E. Wood of Denver had developed his flotation process along the same lines in 1907, patented 1911, with some success on molybdenum ores. For the most part, however, these were isolated attempts without fanfare for what can only be called marginal successes.

In 1911, James M. Hyde, a former employee of Minerals Separation, Ltd., modified the Minerals Separation process and installed a test plant in the Butte and Superior Mill in Basin, Montana, the first such installation in the USA. In 1912, he designed the Butte & Superior zinc works, Butte, Montana, the first great flotation plant in America. Minerals Separation, Ltd., which had set up an office in San Francisco, sued Hyde for infringement as well as the Butte & Superior company, both cases were eventually won by the firm in the U. S. Supreme Court. Daniel Cowan Jackling and partners, who controlled Butte & Superior, also refuted the Minerals Separation patent and funded the ensuing legal battles that lasted over a decade. They - Utah Copper (Kennecott), Nevada Consolidated, Chino Copper, Ray Con and other Jackling firms - eventually settled, in 1922, paying a substantial fee for licenses to use the Minerals Separation process. One unfortunate result of the dispute was professional divisiveness among the mining engineering community for a generation.

In 1913, the Minerals Separation paid for a test plant for the Inspiration Copper Company at Miami, Arizona. Built under the San Francisco office director, Edward Nutter, it proved a success. Inspiration engineer L. D. Ricketts ripped out a gravity concentration mill and replaced it with the Minerals Separation process, the first major use of the process at an American copper mine. A major holder of Inspiration stock were men who controlled the great Anaconda mine of Butte. They immediately followed the Inspiration success to build a Minerals Separation licensed plant at Butte, in 1915–1916, a major statement about the final acceptance of the Minerals Separation patented process.

John M. Callow, of General Engineering of Salt Lake City, had followed flotation from technical papers and the introduction in both the Butte and Superior Mill, and at Inspiration Copper in Arizona and determined that mechanical agitation was a drawback to the existing technology. Introducing a porous brick with compressed air, and a mechanical stirring mechanism, Callow applied for a patent in 1914 (some say that Callow, a Jackling partisan, invented his cell as a means to avoid paying royalties to Minerals Separation, which firms using his cell eventually were forced to do by the courts). This method, known as Pneumatic Flotation, was recognized as an alternative to the Minerals Separation process of flotation concentration. The American Institute of Mining Engineers presented Callow the James Douglas Gold Medal in 1926 for his contributions to the field of flotation. By that time, flotation technology was changing, especially with the discovery of the use of xanthates and other reagents, which made the Callow cell and his process obsolete.

Montana Tech professor Antoine Marc Gaudin defined the early period of flotation as the mechanical phase while by the late 1910s it entered the chemical phase. Discoveries in reagents, especially the use of xanthates patented by Minerals Separations chemist Cornelius H. Keller, not so much increased the capture of minerals through the process as making it far more manageable in day-to-day operations. Minerals Separation's initial flotation patents ended 1923, and new ones for chemical processes gave it a significant position into the 1930s. During this period the company also developed and patented flotation processes for iron out of its Hibbing lab and of phosphate in its Florida lab. Another rapid phase of flotation process innovation did not occur until after 1960.

In the 1960s the froth flotation technique was adapted for deinking recycled paper.

The success of the process is evinced by the number of claimants as "discoverers" of flotation. In 1961, American engineers celebrated "50 years of flotation" and enshrined James Hyde and his Butte & Superior mill. In 1977, German engineers celebrated the "hundredth anniversary of flotation" based on the brothers Bessel patent of 1877. The historic Glasdir copper mine site advertises its tours in Wales as site of the "discovery of flotation" based upon the Elmore brothers work. Recent writers, because of the interest in celebrating women in science, champion Carrie Everson of Denver as mother of the process based on her 1885 patent. Omitted from this list are the engineers, metallurgists and chemists of Minerals Separation, Ltd., which, at least in the American and Australian courts, won control of froth flotation patents as well as right of claimant as discoverers of froth flotation. But, as historian Martin Lynch writes, "Mineral Separation would eventually prevail after taking the case to the US Supreme Court [and the House of Lords], and in so doing earned for itself the cordial detestation of many in the mining world."

Further improvements have come from Australia in the form of the Jameson Cell, developed at the University of Newcastle, Australia in 1980s. It operates by the use of a plunging jet that generates fine bubbles. These fine bubbles have a higher kinetic energy and a smaller diameter. As such, they can be used for the flotation of fine grained particles.

=== Theory ===
Froth flotation efficiency is determined by a series of probabilities: those of particle–bubble contact, particle–bubble attachment, transport between the pulp and the froth, and froth collection into the product launder. In a conventional mechanically-agitated cell, the void fraction (i.e. volume occupied by air bubbles) is low (5 to 10 percent) and the bubble size is usually greater than 1 mm. This results in a relatively low interfacial area and a low probability of particle–bubble contact. Consequently, several cells in series are required to increase the particle residence time, thus increasing the probability of particle–bubble contact.

==== Selective adhesion ====
Froth flotation depends on the selective adhesion of air bubbles to mineral surfaces in a mineral/water slurry. The air bubbles attach to more hydrophobic particles, as determined by the interfacial energies between the solid, liquid, and gas phases. This energy is determined by the Young–Dupré equation:

$$\gamma_{lv} \cos \theta = (\gamma_{sv} - \gamma_{sl})$$

where:

- γ_{lv} is the surface energy of the liquid/vapor interface
- γ_{sv} is the surface energy of the solid/vapor interface
- γ_{sl} is the surface energy of the solid/liquid interface,
- θ is the contact angle, the angle formed at the junction between vapor, solid, and liquid phases.

Minerals targeted for separation may be chemically surface-modified with collectors so that they are more hydrophobic. Collectors are a type of surfactant that increase the natural hydrophobicity of the surface, increasing the separability of the hydrophobic and hydrophilic particles. Collectors either chemically bond via chemisorption to the mineral or adsorb onto the surface via physisorption.

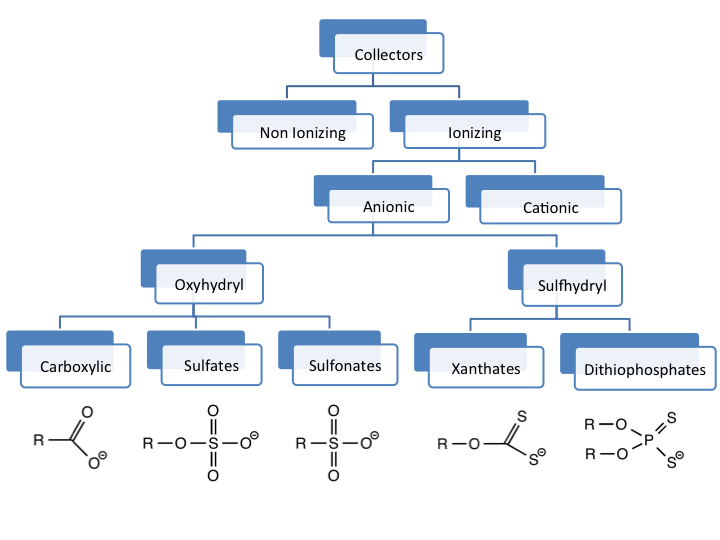
Different types of collectors, or surfactants, used in froth flotation.

==== IMFs and surface forces in bubble-particle interactions ====
===== Collision =====
The collision rates for fine particles (50 - 80 μm) can be accurately modeled, but there is no current theory that accurately models bubble-particle collision for particles as large as 300 μm, which are commonly used in flotation processes.

For fine particles, Stokes law underestimates collision probability while the potential equation based on surface charge overestimates collision probability so an intermediate equation is used.

It is important to know the collision rates in the system since this step precedes the adsorption where a three phase system is formed.

===== Adsorption (attachment) =====
The effectiveness of a medium to adsorb to a particle is influenced by the relationship between the surfaces of both materials. There are multiple factors that affect the efficiency of adsorption in chemical, thermodynamic, and physical domains. These factors can range from surface energy and polarity to the shape, size, and roughness of the particle. In froth flotation, adsorption is a strong consequence of surface energy, since the small particles have a high surface area to size ratio, resulting in higher energy surfaces to form attractions with adsorbates. The air bubbles must selectively adhere to the desired minerals to elevate them to the surface of the slurry while wetting the other minerals and leaving them in the aqueous slurry medium.

Particles that can be easily wetted by water are called hydrophilic, while particles that are not easily wetted by water are called hydrophobic. Hydrophobic particles have a tendency to form a separate phase in aqueous media. In froth flotation the effectiveness of an air bubble to adhere to a particle is based on how hydrophobic the particle is. Hydrophobic particles have an affinity to air bubbles, leading to adsorption. The bubble-particle combinations are elevated to the froth zone driven by buoyancy forces.

The attachment of the bubbles to the particles is determined by the interfacial energies of between the solid, liquid, and vapor phases, as modeled by the Young/Dupre Equation. The interfacial energies can be based on the natural structure of the materials, or the addition of chemical treatments can improve energy compatibility.

Collectors are the main additives used to improve particle surfaces. They function as surfactants to selectively isolate and aid adsorption between the particles of interest and bubbles rising through the slurry. Common collectors used in flotation are anionic sulfur ligands, which have a bifunctional structure with an ionic portion which shares attraction with metals, and a hydrophobic portion such as a long hydrocarbon tail. These collectors coat a particle's surface with a monolayer of non-polar substance to aid separation from the aqueous phase by decreasing the adsorbed particle solubility in water. The adsorbed ligands can form micelles around the particles and form small-particle colloids improving stability and phase separation further.

The main considerations when selecting collectors is the nature of the head group and the size of the hydrocarbon chain. The hydrocarbon tail needs to be short to maximize the selectivity of the desired mineral and the headgroup dictates which minerals it attaches to.

===== Desorption (detachment) =====
The adsorption of particles to bubbles is essential to separating the minerals from the slurry, but the minerals must be purified from the additives used in separation, such as the collectors, frothers, and modifiers. The product of the cleaning, or desorption process, is known as the cleaner concentrate. The detachment of a particle and bubble requires adsorption bond cleavage driven by shear forces. Depending on the flotation cell type, shear forces are applied by a variety of mechanical systems. Among the most common are impellers and mixers. Some systems combine the functionalities of these components by placing them at key locations where they can take part in multiple froth flotation mechanisms. Cleaning cells also take advantage of gravitational forces to improve separation efficiency. Desorption itself is a chemical phenomenon where compounds are just physically attached to each other without having any chemical bond.

==== Performance calculations ====
===== Relevant equations =====
A common quantity used to describe the collection efficiency of a froth flotation process is flotation recovery ($R$). This quantity incorporates the probabilities of collision and attachment of particles to gas flotation bubbles.

$$R = \frac{N_c} {\left(\tfrac{\pi}{4}\right)\left(d_p+d_b\right)^2 Hc}$$

where:

- $N_c = PN_c^i$, which is the product of the probability of the particle being collected ($P$) and the number of possible particle collisions ($N_c^i$)
- $d_p$ is particle diameter
- $d_b$ is bubble diameter
- $H$ is a specified height within the flotation which the recovery was calculated
- $c$ is the particle concentration

The following are several additional mathematical methods often used to evaluate the effectiveness of froth flotation processes. These equations are more simple than the calculation for flotation recovery, as they are based solely on the amounts of inputs and outputs of the processes.

For the following equations:

- $F$ is the weight percent of feed
- $C$ is the weight percent concentrate
- $T$ is the weight percent of tailings
- $c$, $t$, and $f$ are the metallurgical assays of the concentrate, tailings, and feed, respectively

Ratio of feed weight to concentrate weight $\tfrac {F}{C}$ (unitless)

$$\frac{F}{C} = \frac{c-t}{f-t}$$

Percent of metal recovered ($\Chi_R$) in wt%

$$\Chi_R = 100\left(\frac{c}{f}\right)\left(\frac{f-t}{c-t}\right)$$

Percent of metal lost ($\Chi_L$) in wt%

$$\Chi_L = 100 - \Chi_R$$

Percent of weight recovered $\left(\Chi_W\right)$ in wt%

$$\Chi_W = 100\left(\frac{C}{F}\right) = 100\frac{f-t}{c-t}$$

Example grade-recovery relationships seen in froth flotation. Shifts in the curves represent changes in flotation effectiveness.

This can be calculated using weights and assays, as $\frac{Cc}{Ff}*100$. Or, since $\frac{C}{F} = \frac{f-t}{c-t}$, the percent of metal recovered ($\Chi_R$) can be calculated from assays alone using $\Chi_R = 100\left(\frac{c}{f}\right)\left(\frac{f-t}{c-t}\right)$.

Percent of metal lost is the opposite of the percent of metal recovered, and represents the material lost to the tailings.

== See also ==
- Deinking
- Dissolved air flotation (DAF)
- Flocculation
- List of waste-water treatment technologies
