= C8H9ClO =

The molecular formula C_{8}H_{9}ClO may refer to:

- Benzyl chloromethyl ether
- Chloroxylenol
