= Methoxymethyl ether =

Functional part of an organic molecule

In organic chemistry, a methoxymethyl ether is a functional group with the formula ROCH_{2}OCH_{3}, abbreviated MOM. The group is usually derived from chloromethyl methyl ether, a kind of chloroalkyl ether which is, like its congeners, often employed in organic synthesis to protect alcohols. Closely related to MOM ethers are methoxyethoxymethoxy (MEM) protecting groups, introduced using 2-methoxyethoxymethyl chloride. The MEM protecting groups are more easily installed and more easily removed.

== Protection ==
Typically, the alcohol is protected by addition of the chloromethyl reagent followed by deprotonation with a non-nucleophilic base such as N,N-diisopropylethylamine (DIPEA) in dichloromethane.

Although not relevant to protecting groups, MOM groups are installed by reaction of chloromethyl ethers with methoxide and by the acid-catalyzed reaction of alcohols with dimethoxymethane.

== Deprotection ==
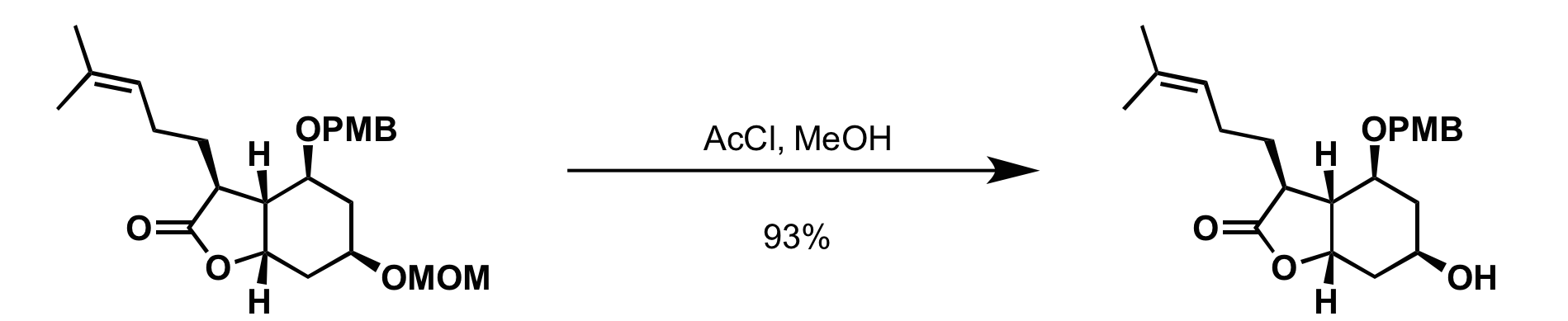

The MOM and the MEM protecting groups can be cleaved with a range of Lewis and Brønsted acids.

== Safety ==
Chloromethyl methyl ether and chloromethoxyethoxymethane, like other chloroalkyl ethers, are strong alkylating agents with attendant dangers. These compounds are human carcinogen.
