= Benzyl chloromethyl ether =

Names
- Preferred IUPAC name Chloromethoxymethylbenzene
- Other names: BOM chloride; benzyloxymethyl chloride

Identifiers
CAS Number	3587-60-8
3D model (JSmol)	Interactive image
ChemSpider	121628
ECHA InfoCard	100.157.155
EC Number	628-927-1
PubChem CID	137983
UNII	9GR9P34HWY
CompTox Dashboard (EPA)	DTXSID10956786
- InChI: InChI=1S/C8H9ClO/c9-7-10-6-8-4-2-1-3-5-8/h1-5H,6-7H2 Key: LADPCMZCENPFGV-UHFFFAOYSA-N
- SMILES: C1=CC=C(C=C1)COCCl

Properties
Chemical formula	C_{8}H_{9}ClO
Molar mass	156.61 g·mol^{−1}
Density	1.1350

Hazards
- GHS labelling
Pictograms	(GHS05: Corrosive) (GHS06: Toxic) (GHS07: Exclamation mark) (GHS08: Health hazard)
Signal word	Danger
Hazard statements	H302, H315, H318, H331, H334
Precautionary statements	P233, P260, P264, P264+P265, P270, P271, P280, P284, P301+P317, P302+P352, P304+P340, P305+P354+P338, P316, P317, P321, P330, P332+P317, P342+P316, P362+P364, P403, P403+P233, P405, P501
- Except where otherwise noted, data are given for materials in their standard state (at 25 °C [77 °F], 100 kPa). Infobox references

Benzyl chloromethyl ether is a chemical compound with the chemical formula C_{6}H_{5}CH_{2}OCH_{2}Cl. Like similar chloroalkyl ethers, it is an alkylating reagent, and is primarily used to prepare benzyloxymethyl protecting groups for alcohols in organic synthesis.

== Preparation ==
Benzyl chloromethyl ether may be prepared from benzyl alcohol, formaldehyde, and hydrogen chloride in anhydrous conditions.

== Applications ==
Benzyl chloromethyl ether has the typical reactions of a chloroalkyl ether. In particular, it reacts with all types of alcohol in the presence of a weak, sterically hindered base such as N,N-diisopropylethylamine. This reaction yields benzyloxymethyl ethers, a protecting group similar to methoxymethyl ethers but with some properties of benzyl ethers. Like benzyl ethers, benzyloxymethyl ethers can be removed by hydrogenolysis with palladium on carbon or by Birch reduction.

== Safety ==
Like many alkylating agents, benzyl chloromethyl ether is cytotoxic and a probable human carcinogen. Hydrolysis and alcoholysis yield hydrogen chloride.
