= Chloroalkyl ether =

Chemical structure of chloromethyl methyl ether (MOM-Cl)

Chloroalkyl ethers are a class of organic compounds with the general structure R-O-(CH_{2})_{n}-Cl, characterized as an ether connected to a chloromethyl group via an alkane chain.

Chloromethyl methyl ether (CMME) is an ether with the formula CH_{3}OCH_{2}Cl. It is used as an alkylating agent and industrial solvent to manufacture dodecylbenzyl chloride, water repellents, ion-exchange resins, polymers, and as a chloromethylation reagent. In organic synthesis the compound is used for the introduction of the methoxymethyl (MOM) protecting group.

Closely related compounds of industrial importance are bis(chloromethyl) ether (BCME) (closely related to chemical weapon sulfur mustard) and benzyl chloromethyl ether (BOMCl).

Chloromethyl ether	R	Chemical structure	Molar mass (g/mol)	CAS number	Boiling point (°C)
Benzyl chloromethyl ether	Benzyl	benzyl chloromethyl ether	156.61	3587-60-8	102 °C @ 14 mmHg (1.9 kPa)
Chloromethyl methyl ether	Methyl	methyl chloromethyl ether	80.51	107-30-2	55-57
Bis(chloromethyl) ether	Chloromethyl		114.96	542-88-1	106
tert-Butyl chloromethyl ether	tert-Butyl		124.5	40556-01-2	
2-Methoxyethoxymethyl chloride	Methoxyethyl		124.57	3970-21-6	50-52 °C @ 13 mmHg (1.7 kPa)
Dichloromethyl methyl ether	Methyl		114.96	4885-02-3	82 - 85.5 °C
Representative chloroalkyl ethers

Methoxymethyl ethers (MOMs) and methoxyethyl ethers (MEMs) are common protecting groups in organic synthesis.

== Safety ==
Chloroalkyl ethers are strong alkylating agents with attendant dangers. These compounds are human carcinogen.
