= Quelet reaction =

Chemical reaction

The Quelet reaction (also called the Blanc–Quelet reaction) is an organic coupling reaction in which a phenolic ether reacts with an aliphatic aldehyde to generate an α-chloroalkyl derivative. The Quelet reaction is an example of a larger class of reaction, electrophilic aromatic substitution. The reaction is named after its creator R. Quelet, who first reported the reaction in 1932, and is similar to the Blanc chloromethylation process.

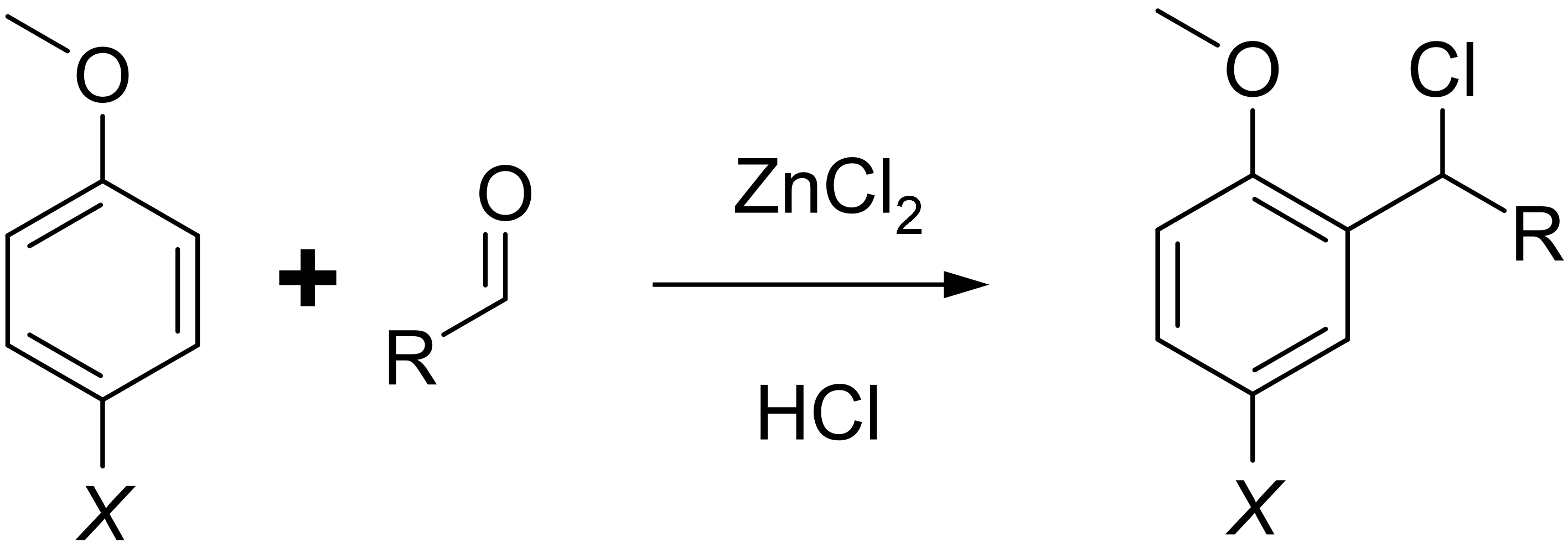
Quelet reaction

The reaction proceeds under strong acid catalysis using HCl; zinc(II) chloride may be used as a catalyst in instances where the ether is deactivated. The reaction primarily yields para-substituted products; however it can also produce ortho-substituted compounds if the para site is blocked.

== Mechanism ==
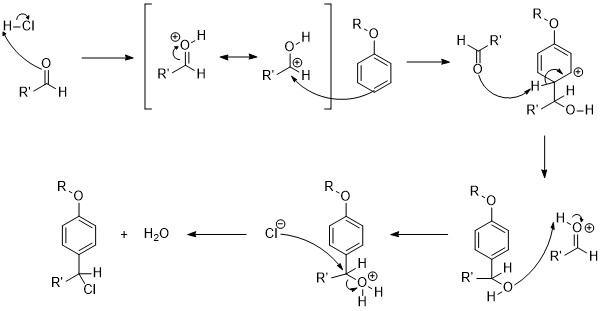
The complete step-by-step mechanism of the Quelet Reaction in HCl, including all formal charges.

The mechanism of the Quelet reaction is primarily categorized as a reaction in polar acid. First, the carbonyl is protonated forming a highly reactive protonated aldehyde that acts as the electrophile to the nucleophilic pi-bond of the aromatic ring. Next, the aromatic ring is reformed via E1. Finally, the hydroxy group formed from the carbonyl oxygen is protonated a second time and leaves as a molecule of water, creating a carbocation that is attacked by the negatively charged chlorine ion.

== Reaction conditions and limitations ==
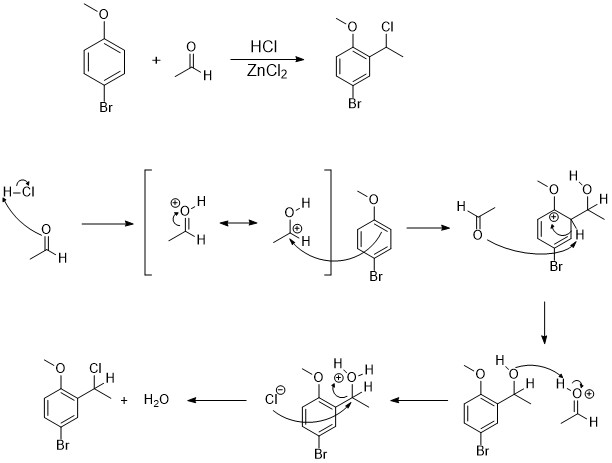
Electrophilic aromatic substitution of a para-substituted aromatic compound via the Quelet reaction. Notice, the new group is directed to the ortho position.

The reaction requires a strong acid catalyst, but both Lewis acids and Brownsted-Lowry acids can be used in the Quelet reaction. It has been noted that aqueous formaldehyde sometimes produces a better yield than paraformaldehyde. The reaction was first reported using zinc(II) chloride, however the reaction has been noted to proceed in the absence of this catalyst in highly activated aromatic compounds. If using an aromatic compound where the para-site is blocked, the reaction will add in the ortho-position (see example right).

Not all aromatic compounds can undergo Quelet reactions. For example, too highly halogenated aromatic compounds, aromatic compounds with nitro groups, and terphenyls cannot be used as reactants for Quelet reactions. Even for compounds that can undergo Quelet reactions, there sometimes exists other reactions that produce the same products in higher yields. The Quelet reaction can produce dangerous halomethyl ethers, gaseous and liquid compounds that are toxic to humans, and therefore is sometimes passed up for chloromethylations without these harmful byproducts.

== Usage ==
The Quelet reaction is an important step in the polymerization of aromatic monomers, such as styrene, PPO and PPEK. These chloromethylated aromatic polymers are used in a diverse set of industries, such as fuel cells and membranes for drug delivery.

== See also ==
- Blanc reaction
- Electrophilic aromatic substitution
- Friedel-Crafts Alkylation
