= C2H5ClO =

The molecular formula C_{2}H_{5}ClO (molar mass: 80.51 g/mol, exact mass: 80.0029 u) may refer to:

- 1-Chloroethanol
- 2-Chloroethanol
- Chloromethyl methyl ether (CMME)
- Ethyl hypochlorite
