= Merrifield resin =

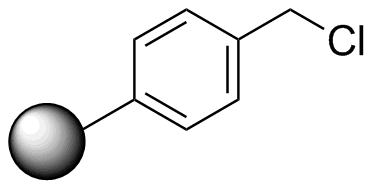

Merrifield resin is a cross-linked polystyrene resin that carries a chloromethyl functional group. Merrifield resin is named after its inventor, Robert Bruce Merrifield (1984 winner of the Nobel Prize in Chemistry) and is used in solid-phase synthesis. The material is typically available as white beads. These beads are allowed to swell in suitable solvents (ethyl acetate, DMF, DMSO), which then allows the reagents to substitute the chloride substituents.

Merrifield Resin can be prepared by chloromethylation of polystyrene or by the copolymerization of styrene and 4-vinylbenzyl chloride.
