= Methylthiomethyl ether =

In organic chemistry a methylthiomethyl (MTM) ether is a protective group for hydroxyl groups. Hydroxyl groups are present in many chemical compounds and they must be protected during oxidation, acylation, halogenation, dehydration and other reactions to which they are susceptible.

Many kinds of protective groups for hydroxyl groups have been developed and used in organic chemistry, but the number of protective groups for tertiary hydroxyl groups, which are susceptible to acid-catalyzed dehydration, is still small because of their poor reactiveness. They can be easily protected with MTM ethers and recovered in good yield.

To introduce an MTM ether to a hydroxyl group, two methods are mainly used. One is a typical Williamson ether synthesis using an MTM halide as an MTM resource and sodium hydride (NaH) as a base. The other is a special method, in which dimethyl sulfoxide (DMSO) and acetic anhydride (Ac_{2}O) are used. In this case, the reaction proceeds with Pummerer rearrangement:

MTM ethers have another advantage. They are removed by neutral (but toxic) mercuric chloride, to which most other ethers are stable. As a result, the selective deprotection of polyfunctional molecules becomes possible using MTM ethers as the protective groups for their hydroxyl groups.

== Alcohol protection ==
Methylthiomethyl (MTM) group is used as a protecting group for alcohols in organic synthesis. This type of alcohol protecting group is robust under mild acidic reaction conditions.

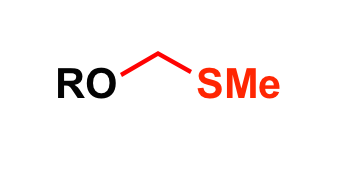

=== Most common protection methods ===
- Treatment of alcohol with sodium hydride and methylthiomethyl halide
- Dimethyl sulfoxide (DMSO) and acetic acid (AcOH) in acetic anhydride (Ac_{2}O) at ambient temperature

=== Most common deprotection methods ===
- Mercury (II) chloride (HgCl_{2}); calcium carbonate (CaCO_{3}) is used as an acid scavenger for acid sensitive substrates

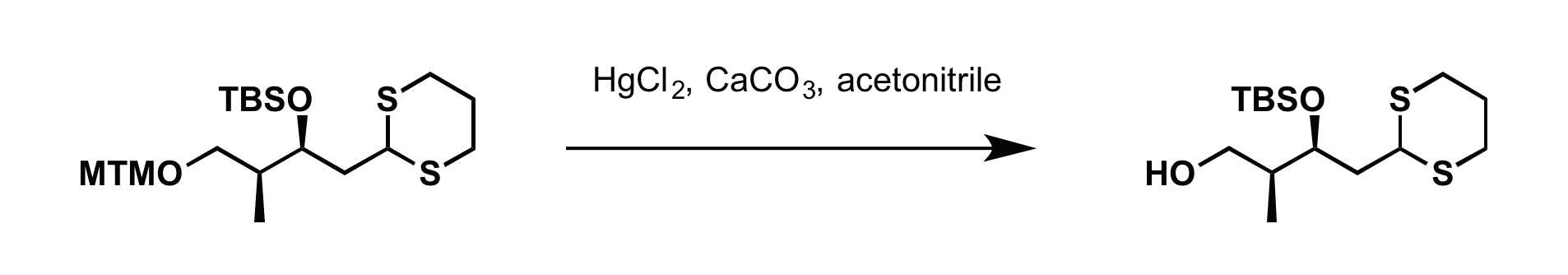

- Iodomethane (MeI) in presence of sodium bicarbonate (NaHCO_{3}) at elevated temperatures (this type of reaction is generally carried out in acetone/H_{2}O solution)
- Magnesium iodide (MgI_{2}) and acetic anhydride (Ac_{2}O) in ether at ambient temperature
