= Blanc chloromethylation =

Chemical reaction

Named after	Gustave Louis Blanc
Reaction type	Substitution reaction

Identifiers
Organic Chemistry Portal	blanc-reaction

The Blanc chloromethylation (also called the Blanc reaction) is the chemical reaction of aromatic rings with formaldehyde and hydrogen chloride to form chloromethyl arenes. The reaction is catalyzed by Lewis acids such as zinc chloride. The reaction was discovered by Gustave Louis Blanc (1872–1927) in 1923.

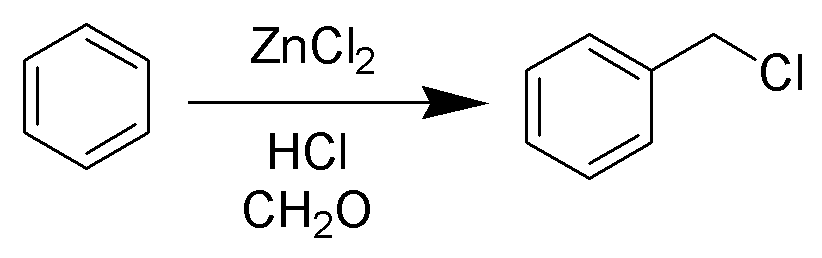
Blanc chloromethylation

== Mechanism and scope ==
The reaction is carried out under acidic conditions and with a ZnCl_{2} catalyst. These conditions protonate the formaldehyde carbonyl making the carbon much more electrophilic. The aldehyde is then attacked by the aromatic pi-electrons, followed by rearomatization of the aromatic ring. The benzyl alcohol thus formed is quickly converted to the chloride under the reaction conditions.

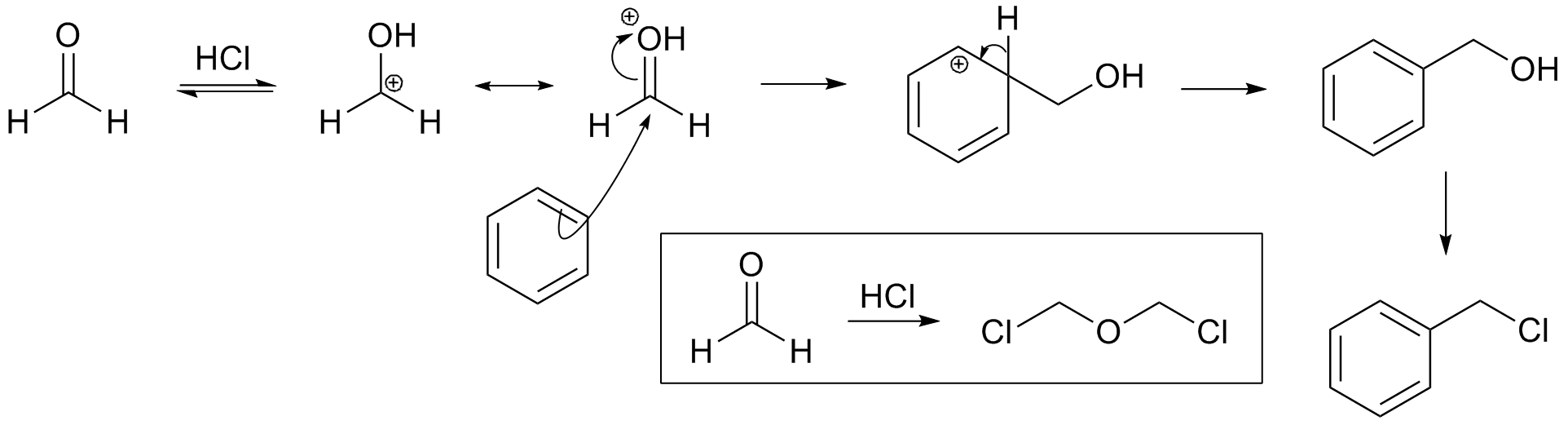
Mechanism of Blanc chloromethylation

Other possibilities for the electrophile include (chloromethyl)oxonium cation (ClH_{2}C–OH_{2}^{+}) or chlorocarbenium cation (ClCH_{2}^{+}), which may be formed in the presence of zinc chloride. These species may account for the fact that moderately and strongly deactivated substrates that are inert to Friedel-Crafts reactions like acetophenone, nitrobenzene and p-chloronitrobenzene do show marginal reactivity of limited synthetic utility under chloromethylation conditions. Deactivated substrates give better results under modified chloromethylation conditions using chloromethyl methyl ether (MOMCl) in the presence of 60% H_{2}SO_{4}.

Highly activated arenes like phenols and anilines are not suitable substrates, since they undergo further electrophilic attack by Friedel-Crafts alkylation with the formed benzylic alcohol/chloride in an uncontrolled manner. In general, the formation of diarylmethane side product is a common outcome.

Although the reaction is an efficient means of introducing a chloromethyl group, the production of small amounts of highly carcinogenic bis(chloromethyl) ether is a disadvantage for industrial applications.

The corresponding fluoromethylation, bromomethylation and iodomethylation reactions can also be achieved, using the appropriate hydrohalic acid.

== Related chloromethylations ==
Chloromethylation of thiols can be effected with concentrated HCl and formaldehyde:

ArSH + CH_{2}O + HCl → ArSCH_{2}Cl + H_{2}O

Chloromethylation can also be effected using chloromethyl methyl ether:

ArH + CH_{3}OCH_{2}Cl → ArCH_{2}Cl + CH_{3}OH

This reaction is employed in the chloromethylation of styrene in the production of ion-exchange resins and Merrifield resins.

== Additional reading ==
- Whitmore, F. C.; Ginsburg, Abram; Rueggeberg, Walter; Tharp, I.; Nottorf, H.; Cannon, M.; Carnahan, F.; Cryder, D.; FLeming, G.; Goldberg, G.; Haggard, H.; Herr, C.; Hoover, T.; Lovell, H.; Mraz, R.; Noll, C.; Oakwood, T.; Patterson, H.; Van Strien, R.; Walter, R.; Zook, H.; Wagner, R.; Weisgerber, C.; Wilkins, J. (May 1946). "Production of Benzyl Chloride by Chloromethylation of Benzene. Laboratory and Pilot Plant Studies". Industrial & Engineering Chemistry. 38 (5): 478–485. doi:10.1021/ie50437a013.

== Safety ==
The reaction is performed with care as, like most chloromethylation reactions, it produces highly carcinogenic bis(chloromethyl) ether as a by-product.

== See also ==
- Friedel-Crafts alkylation
- Quelet reaction
- Bouveault–Blanc reduction
