= Dimethoxymethane =

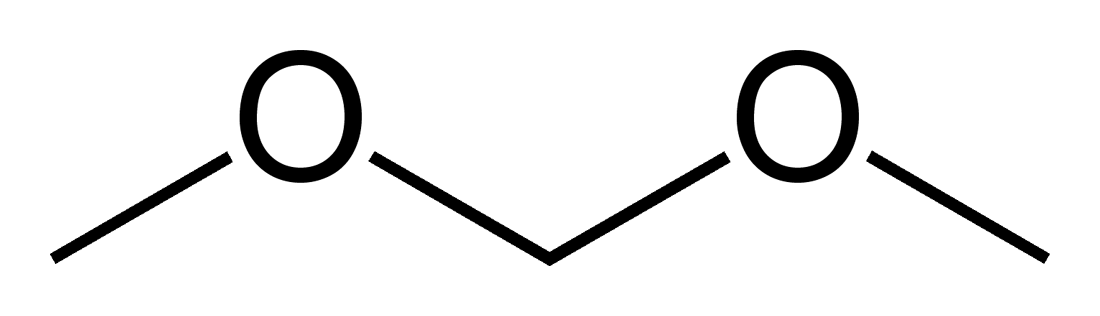
- Structural formula of dimethoxymethane

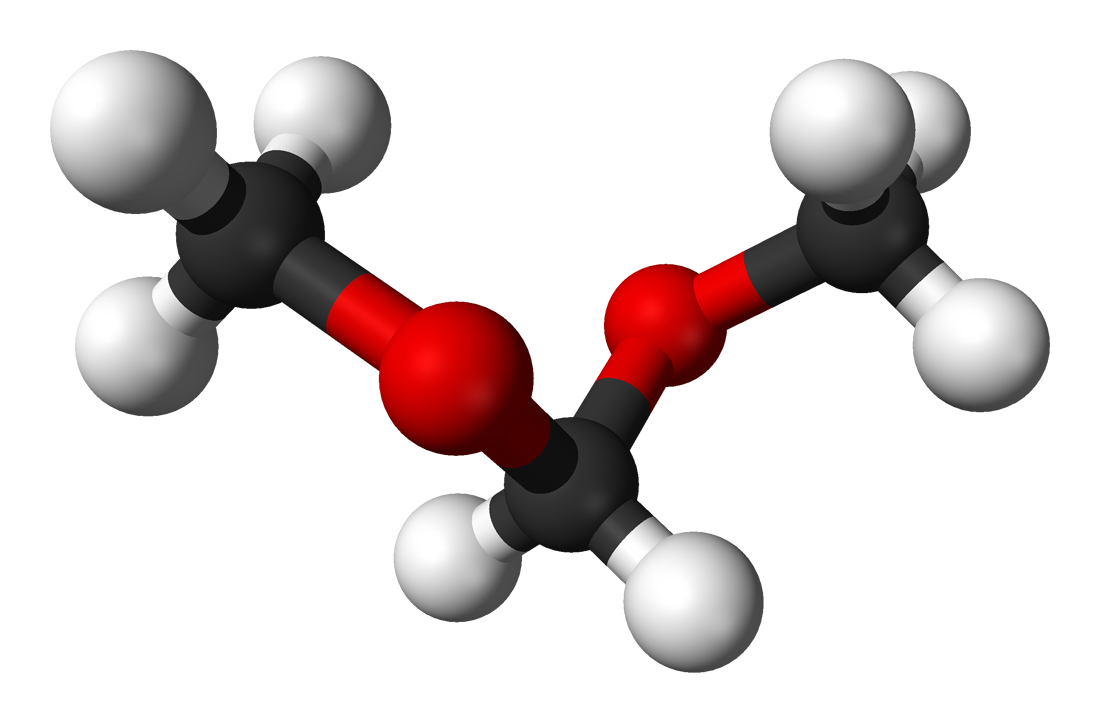
- Ball and stick model of dimethoxymethane

Names
- Preferred IUPAC name Dimethoxymethane
- Other names Formal Formaldehyde dimethyl ether Methylal; Dimethylformal (DMFL); Formaldehyde dimethylacetal Methoxymethyl methyl ether Methylene dimethyl ether

Identifiers
CAS Number	109-87-5
3D model (JSmol)	Interactive image
Beilstein Reference	1697025
ChEBI	CHEBI:48341
ChEMBL	ChEMBL15537
ChemSpider	13837190
ECHA InfoCard	100.003.378
EC Number	203-714-2
Gmelin Reference	100776
MeSH	Dimethoxymethane
PubChem CID	8020
RTECS number	PA8750000
UNII	7H1M4G2NUE
UN number	1234
CompTox Dashboard (EPA)	DTXSID101337651 DTXSID1025564, DTXSID101337651
- InChI: InChI=1S/C3H8O2/c1-4-3-5-2/h3H2,1-2H3 Key: NKDDWNXOKDWJAK-UHFFFAOYSA-N; InChI=1/C3H8O2/c1-4-3-5-2/h3H2,1-2H3 Key: NKDDWNXOKDWJAK-UHFFFAOYAE
- SMILES: COCOC

Properties
Chemical formula	C_{3}H_{8}O_{2}
Molar mass	76.095 g·mol^{−1}
Appearance	Colorless liquid
Odor	Chloroform-like
Density	0.8593 g cm^{−3} (at 20 °C)
Melting point	−105 °C (−157 °F; 168 K)
Boiling point	42 °C (108 °F; 315 K)
Solubility in water	33% (20 °C)
Vapor pressure	330 mmHg (20 °C)
Magnetic susceptibility (χ)	−47.3·10^{−6} cm^{3}/mol

Hazards
- GHS labelling
Pictograms	(GHS02: Flammable) (GHS07: Exclamation mark)
Signal word	Danger
Hazard statements	H225, H315, H319, H335
Precautionary statements	P210, P233, P240, P241, P242, P243, P261, P264, P271, P280, P302+P352, P303+P361+P353, P304+P340, P305+P351+P338, P312, P321, P332+P313, P337+P313, P362, P370+P378, P403+P233, P403+P235, P405, P501
Flash point	−18 °C (0 °F; 255 K)
Explosive limits	2.2–13.8%
- Lethal dose or concentration (LD, LC)
LD_{50} (median dose)	5708 mg/kg (rabbit, oral)
LC_{50} (median concentration)	18000 ppm (mouse, 7 hr); 15000 ppm (rat); 18354 ppm (mouse, 7 hr)
- NIOSH (US health exposure limits)
PEL (Permissible)	TWA 1000 ppm (3100 mg/m^{3})
REL (Recommended)	TWA 1000 ppm (3100 mg/m^{3})
IDLH (Immediate danger)	2200 ppm

Related compounds
Related Ethers	Dimethoxyethane
- Except where otherwise noted, data are given for materials in their standard state (at 25 °C [77 °F], 100 kPa). verify (what is ?) Infobox references

Dimethoxymethane, also called methylal, is a colorless flammable liquid with a low boiling point, low viscosity and excellent dissolving power. It has a chloroform-like odor and a pungent taste. It is the dimethyl acetal of formaldehyde. Dimethoxymethane is soluble in three parts water and miscible with most common organic solvents.

== Synthesis and structure ==
It can be manufactured by oxidation of methanol or by the reaction of formaldehyde with methanol. In aqueous acid, it is hydrolyzed back to formaldehyde and methanol.

Due to the anomeric effect, dimethoxymethane has a preference toward the gauche conformation with respect to each of the C–O bonds, instead of the anti conformation. Since there are two C–O bonds, the most stable conformation is gauche-gauche, which is around 7 kcal/mol more stable than the anti-anti conformation, while the gauche-anti and anti-gauche are intermediate in energy. Since it is one of the smallest molecules exhibiting this effect, which has great interest in carbohydrate chemistry, dimethoxymethane is often used for theoretical studies of the anomeric effect.

== Applications ==
Industrially, it is primarily used as a solvent and in the manufacture of perfumes, resins, adhesives, paint strippers and protective coatings. Another application is as a gasoline-additive for increasing octane number. Dimethoxymethane can also be used for blending with diesel.

=== Reagent in organic synthesis ===
Another useful application of dimethoxymethane is to protect alcohols with a methoxymethyl (MOM) ether in organic synthesis. Dimethoxymethane can be activated with phosphorus pentoxide in dichloromethane or chloroform. This method is preferred to the use of chloromethyl methyl ether (MOMCl). Phenols can also be MOM-protected using dimethoxymethane, p-toluenesulfonic acid. Alternatively, MOMCl can be generated as a solution by treating dimethoxymethane with an acyl chloride in the presence of a Lewis acid catalyst like zinc bromide:

MeOCH_{2}OMe + RC(=O)Cl → MeOCH_{2}Cl + RC(=O)(OMe)).

Unlike the classical procedure, which uses formaldehyde and hydrogen chloride as starting materials, the highly carcinogenic side product bis(chloromethyl) ether is not generated.
