= 2,2,2-Trichloroethoxycarbonyl chloride =

- Skeletal formula of 2,2,2-Trichlorethoxycarbonyl chloride

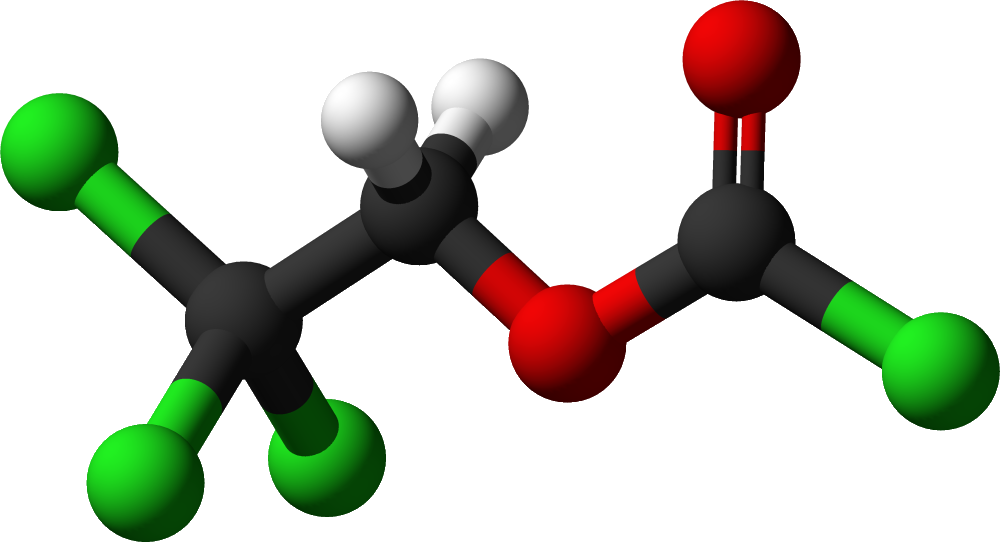
- Ball-and-stick model of the 2,2,2-Trichlorethoxycarbonyl chloride molecule

Names
- Preferred IUPAC name 2,2,2-Trichloroethyl carbonochloridate
- Other names 2,2,2-Trichlorethoxycarbonyl chloride Trichloroethyl chloroformate

Identifiers
CAS Number	17341-93-4
3D model (JSmol)	Interactive image; Interactive image
ChemSpider	78534
ECHA InfoCard	100.037.587
EC Number	241-363-7
PubChem CID	87063
UNII	99UY6LZN4R
CompTox Dashboard (EPA)	DTXSID3066188
- InChI: InChI=1S/C3H2Cl4O2/c4-2(8)9-1-3(5,6)7/h1H2 Key: LJCZNYWLQZZIOS-UHFFFAOYSA-N; InChI=1/C3H2Cl4O2/c4-2(8)9-1-3(5,6)7/h1H2 Key: LJCZNYWLQZZIOS-UHFFFAOYAA
- SMILES: O=C(OCC(Cl)(Cl)Cl)Cl; ClC(Cl)(Cl)COC(Cl)=O

Properties
Chemical formula	C_{3}H_{2}Cl_{4}O_{2}
Molar mass	211.85 g·mol^{−1}
Density	1.539 g/cm^{3}
Melting point	0 °C (32 °F; 273 K)
Boiling point	171 to 172 °C (340 to 342 °F; 444 to 445 K)

Hazards
- GHS labelling
Pictograms	(GHS05: Corrosive) (GHS06: Toxic) (GHS07: Exclamation mark)
Signal word	Danger
Hazard statements	H302, H314, H330, H331
Precautionary statements	P260, P264, P270, P271, P280, P284, P301+P312, P301+P330+P331, P303+P361+P353, P304+P340, P305+P351+P338, P310, P311, P320, P321, P330, P363, P403+P233, P405, P501
- Except where otherwise noted, data are given for materials in their standard state (at 25 °C [77 °F], 100 kPa). verify (what is ?) Infobox references

Trichloroethyl chloroformate is used in organic synthesis for the introduction of the trichloroethoxycarbonyl (Troc) protecting group for amines, thiols and alcohols. It readily cleaves in the presence of other carbamates.

The Troc group is traditionally removed via Zn insertion in the presence of acetic acid, resulting in elimination and decarboxylation.

== Amine protection – 2,2,2-Trichloroethoxycarbonyl (Troc) ==
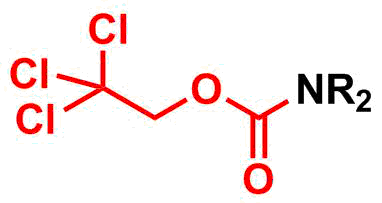
Troc protecting group on an amine

The 2,2,2-Trichloroethoxycarbonyl (Troc) group is largely used as a protecting group for amines in organic synthesis.

=== Most common amine protection methods ===
- 2,2,2-Trichloroethyl chloroformate, pyridine or aqueous sodium hydroxide at ambient temperature

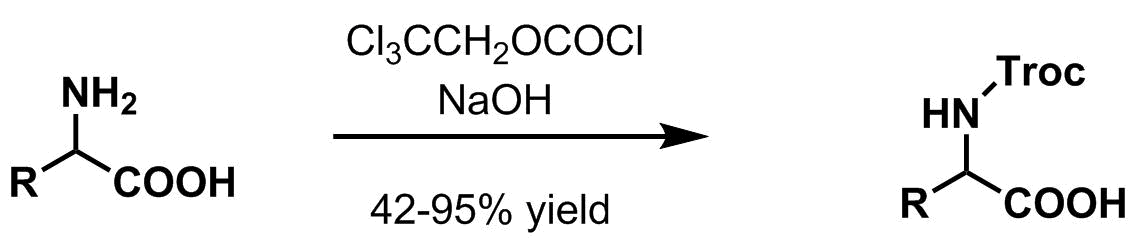

- Electrolysis

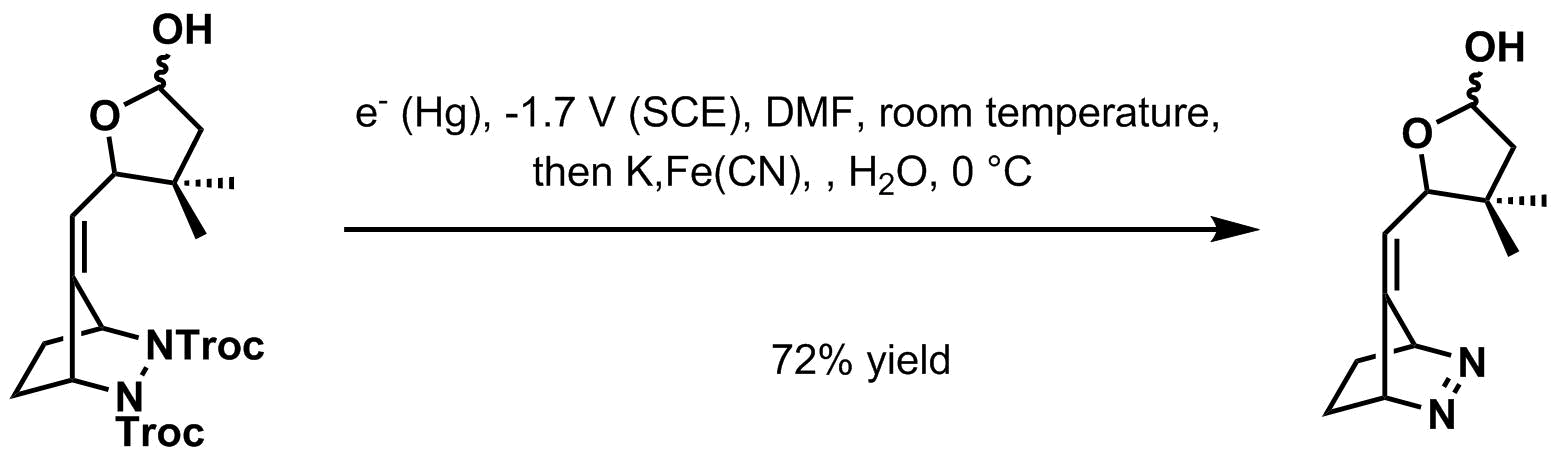

- Deprotection using zinc metal

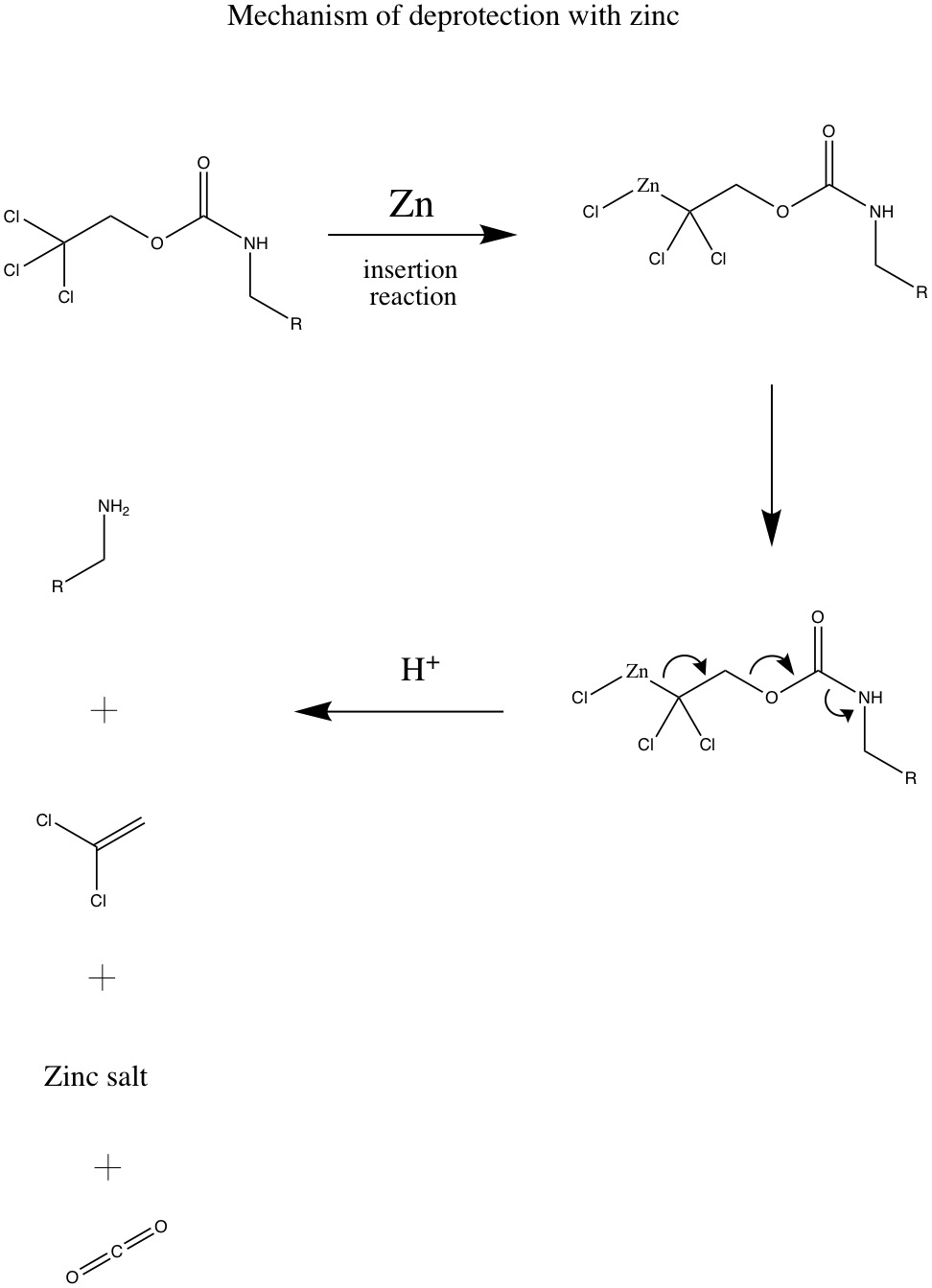
