= 2-Methoxyethoxymethyl chloride =

Names
- Preferred IUPAC name 1-(Chloromethoxy)-2-methoxyethane

Identifiers
CAS Number	3970-21-6
3D model (JSmol)	Interactive image
ChemSpider	69995
ECHA InfoCard	100.021.446
EC Number	223-589-8
PubChem CID	77590
UNII	A5RRM67QUG
CompTox Dashboard (EPA)	DTXSID8063250
- InChI: InChI=1S/C4H9ClO2/c1-6-2-3-7-4-5/h2-4H2,1H3 Key: BIAAQBNMRITRDV-UHFFFAOYSA-N
- SMILES: COCCOCCl

Properties
Chemical formula	C_{4}H_{9}ClO_{2}
Molar mass	124.56 g·mol^{−1}
Appearance	colorless liquid
Density	1.094 g cm^{−3}
Boiling point	50–52 °C (122–126 °F; 323–325 K) 13 mm Hg

Hazards
- GHS labelling
Pictograms	(GHS02: Flammable) (GHS07: Exclamation mark) (GHS08: Health hazard)
Signal word	Danger
Hazard statements	H226, H302, H315, H319, H335
Precautionary statements	P203, P210, P233, P240, P241, P242, P243, P261, P264, P264+P265, P270, P271, P280, P301+P317, P302+P352, P303+P361+P353, P304+P340, P305+P351+P338, P318, P319, P321, P330, P332+P317, P337+P317, P362+P364, P370+P378, P403+P233, P403+P235, P405, P501
- Except where otherwise noted, data are given for materials in their standard state (at 25 °C [77 °F], 100 kPa). Infobox references

2-Methoxyethoxymethyl chloride is an organic compound with formula CH_{3}OCH_{2}CH_{2}OCH_{2}Cl. A colorless liquid, it is classified as a chloroalkyl ether. It is used as an alkylating agent. In organic synthesis, it is used for introducing the methoxyethoxy ether (MEM) protecting group. MEM protecting groups are generally preferred to methoxymethyl (MOM) protecting groups, both in terms of formation and removal.

Typically, the alcohol to be protected is deprotonated with a non-nucleophilic base such as N,N-diisopropylethylamine (DIPEA, Hunig's base) in dichloromethane followed by addition of 2-methoxyethoxymethyl chloride.

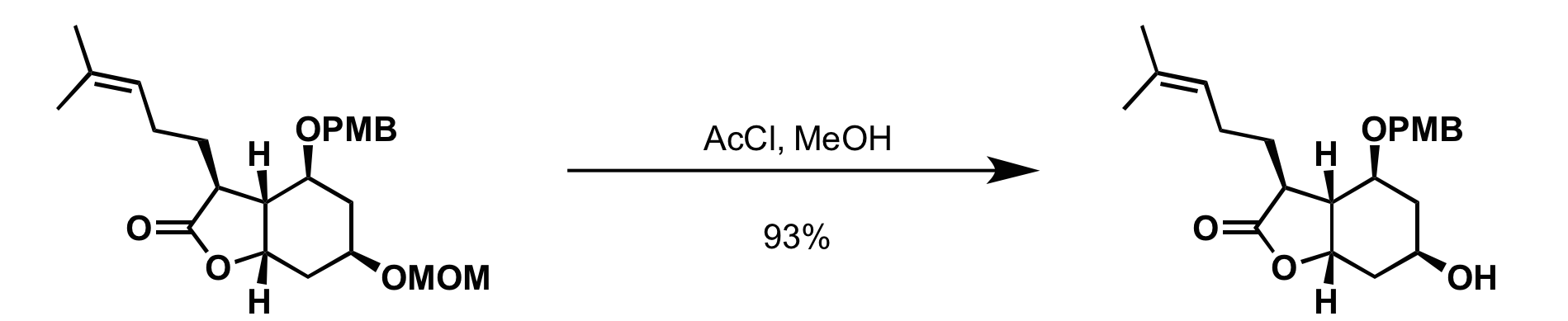

The MEM protecting group can be cleaved (deprotection) with a range of Lewis and Bronsted acids.

== Safety ==
The closely related chloromethyl methyl ether is a known human carcinogen.
