= 4-Vinylbenzyl chloride =

Names
- Preferred IUPAC name 1-(Chloromethyl)-4-ethenylbenzene
- Other names 1-(Chloromethyl)-4-vinylbenzene α-Chloromethylstyrene

Identifiers
CAS Number	1592-20-7
3D model (JSmol)	Interactive image
ChemSpider	66739
ECHA InfoCard	100.014.975
EC Number	250-005-9
PubChem CID	74126
UNII	CJL4OJ6BS0
CompTox Dashboard (EPA)	DTXSID2061808
- InChI: InChI=1S/C9H9Cl/c1-2-8-3-5-9(7-10)6-4-8/h2-6H,1,7H2 Key: ZRZHXNCATOYMJH-UHFFFAOYSA-N
- SMILES: C=Cc1ccc(cc1)CCl

Properties
Chemical formula	C_{9}H_{9}Cl
Molar mass	152.62
Appearance	colorless liquid
Density	1.083
Boiling point	229 °C (444 °F; 502 K)

Hazards
- Occupational safety and health (OHS/OSH)
Main hazards	alkylating agent
- Except where otherwise noted, data are given for materials in their standard state (at 25 °C [77 °F], 100 kPa). Infobox references

4-Vinylbenzyl chloride is an organic compound with the formula ClCH_{2}C_{6}H_{4}CH=CH_{2}. It is a bifunctional molecule, featuring both vinyl and a benzylic chloride functional groups. It is a colorless liquid that is typically stored with a stabilizer to suppress polymerization.

In combination with styrene, vinylbenzyl chloride is used as a comonomer in the production of chloromethylated polystyrene. It is produced by the chlorination of vinyltoluene. Often vinyltoluene consists of a mixture of 3- and 4-vinyl isomers, in which case the vinylbenzyl chloride will also be produced as a mixture of isomers.
