= Bis(chloromethyl) ether =

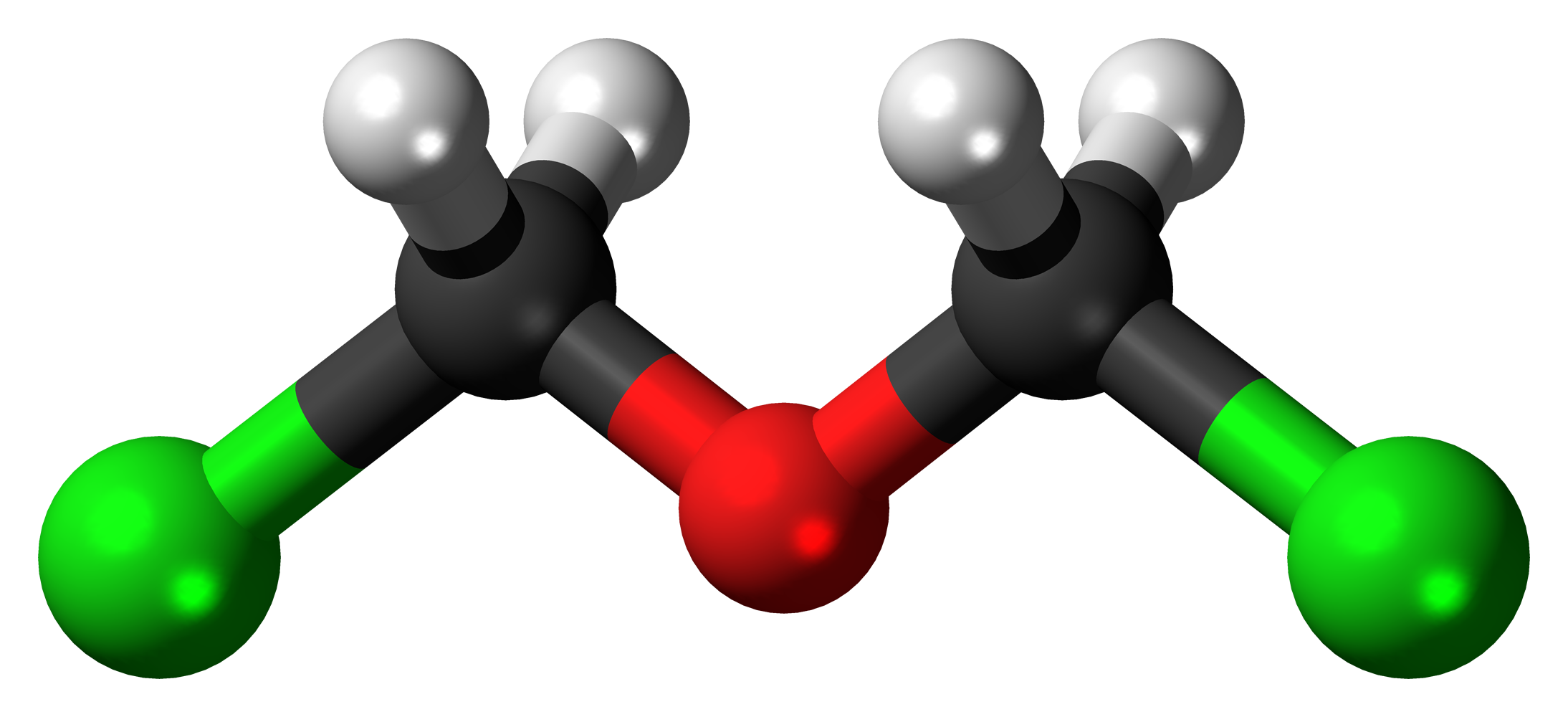

Names
- Preferred IUPAC name Chloro(chloromethoxy)methane
- Other names Bis(chloromethyl) ether Bis-CME; Oxybis(chloromethane); Bis-Chloromethyl ether Chloromethyl ether Dichlorodimethyl ether Dichloromethyl ether

Identifiers
CAS Number	542-88-1
3D model (JSmol)	Interactive image
Abbreviations	BCME
ChEBI	CHEBI:82270
ChemSpider	21106500
ECHA InfoCard	100.008.030
EC Number	208-832-8
KEGG	C19158
PubChem CID	10967
UNII	77382IHE37
CompTox Dashboard (EPA)	DTXSID8020173
- InChI: InChI=1/C2H4Cl2O/c3-1-5-2-4/h1-2H2 Key: HRQGCQVOJVTVLU-UHFFFAOYAN
- SMILES: ClCOCCl

Properties
Chemical formula	C_{2}H_{4}Cl_{2}O
Molar mass	114.95 g·mol^{−1}
Density	1.33 g/cm^{3}
Melting point	−41.5 °C (−42.7 °F; 231.7 K)
Boiling point	106 °C (223 °F; 379 K)
Solubility in water	reacts
Vapor pressure	30 mmHg (22°C)
Refractive index (n_{D})	1.4421

Hazards
- Occupational safety and health (OHS/OSH)
Main hazards	carcinogen, reacts with water
- GHS labelling
Pictograms	(GHS02: Flammable) (GHS06: Toxic) (GHS07: Exclamation mark) (GHS08: Health hazard)
Signal word	Danger
Hazard statements	H225, H302, H311, H330, H350
Flash point	38 °C (100 °F; 311 K)
- NIOSH (US health exposure limits)
PEL (Permissible)	OSHA-regulated carcinogen
REL (Recommended)	potential occupational carcinogen
IDLH (Immediate danger)	N.D.
- Except where otherwise noted, data are given for materials in their standard state (at 25 °C [77 °F], 100 kPa). Infobox references

Bis(chloromethyl) ether is an organic compound with the chemical formula (ClCH_{2})_{2}O. It is a colourless liquid with an unpleasant suffocating odour and it is one of the chloroalkyl ethers. Bis(chloromethyl) ether was once produced on a large scale, but was found to be highly carcinogenic and thus such production has ceased.

== Synthesis ==
It was produced industrially from paraformaldehyde and a mixture of chlorosulfonic acid and sulfuric acid. It is also produced as a byproduct in the Blanc chloromethylation reaction, formed when formaldehyde (the monomer, paraformaldehyde or formalin) and concentrated hydrochloric acid are mixed, and is a known impurity in technical grade chloromethyl methyl ether.

Because of their carcinogenic potency, the industrial production of chloromethyl ethers ended in most countries in the early 1980s. Bis(chloromethyl) ether was no exception to this with production in the U.S.A. ending in 1982.

== Uses ==
Bis(chloromethyl) ether has been extensively used in chemical synthesis, primarily as a crosslinking agent in the manufacture of ion-exchange resins and in the textile industry. It was also used as a linker in the synthesis of certain nerve agent antidotes (asoxime chloride, obidoxime). Bis(chloromethyl) was also effective for chloromethylation of aromatic substrates.

== Safety ==
Bis(chloromethyl) ether is carcinogenic. It is one of 13 chemicals considered an OSHA-regulated occupational carcinogen. Chronic exposure has been linked to in increased risk of lung cancer.

It is classified as an extremely hazardous substance in the United States as defined in Section 302 of the U.S. Emergency Planning and Community Right-to-Know Act (42 U.S.C. 11002), and is subject to strict reporting requirements by facilities which produce, store, or use it in significant quantities.

== See also ==
- Chloromethyl methyl ether - ClCH_{2}OCH_{3}
- Bis(chloroethyl) ether - (ClCH_{2}CH_{2})_{2}O
