= Chloromethyl methyl ether =

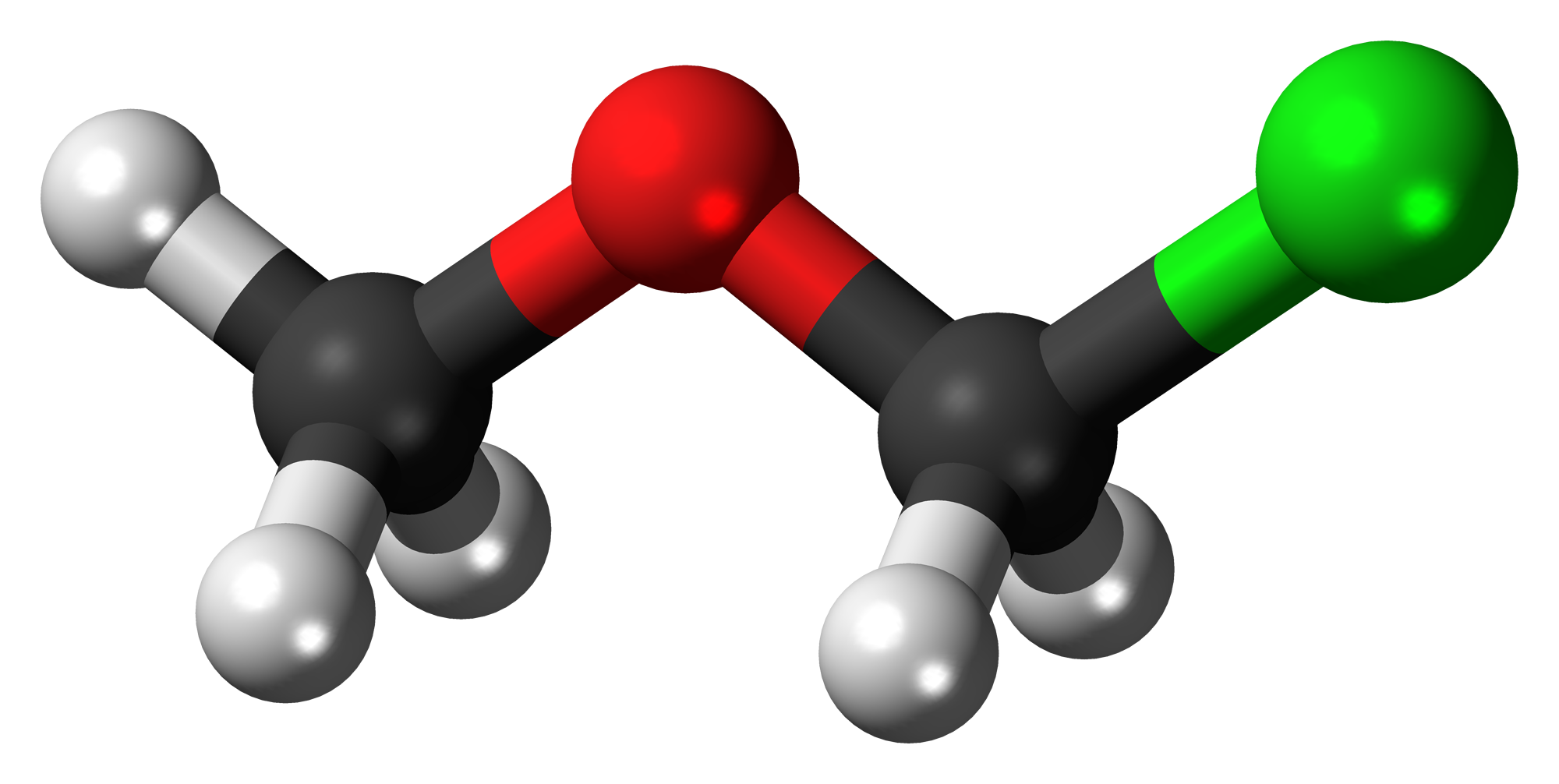

Names
- Preferred IUPAC name Chloro(methoxy)methane
- Other names MOM-Cl, CMME, MCD, Chlorodimethyl ether, Chloromethoxymethane, Dimethylchloroether, Methylchloromethyl ether

Identifiers
| CAS Number | 107-30-2 |
| 3D model (JSmol) | Interactive image |
| ChemSpider | 13852893 |
| ECHA InfoCard | 100.003.165 |
| EC Number | 203-480-1 |
| KEGG | C19160 |
| PubChem CID | 7864 |
| RTECS number | KN6650000 |
| UNII | 334G5B96VG |
| UN number | 1239 |
| CompTox Dashboard (EPA) | DTXSID6020307 |
- InChI: InChI=1S/C2H5ClO/c1-4-2-3/h2H2,1H3 Key: XJUZRXYOEPSWMB-UHFFFAOYSA-N; InChI=1/C2H5ClO/c1-4-2-3/h2H2,1H3 Key: XJUZRXYOEPSWMB-UHFFFAOYAK
- SMILES: COCCl

Properties
| Chemical formula | C_{2}H_{5}ClO |
| Molar mass | 80.51 g·mol^{−1} |
| Appearance | Colorless liquid |
| Odor | Irritating and acrid |
| Density | 1.06 g/mL |
| Melting point | −103.5 °C (−154.3 °F; 169.7 K) |
| Boiling point | 55–57 °C (131–135 °F; 328–330 K) |
| Solubility in water | reacts |
| Solubility | Soluble in alcohol and diethylether |
| Vapor pressure | 192 mmHg (21°C) |

Hazards
- Occupational safety and health (OHS/OSH)
| Main hazards | Carcinogen & Irritant |
- GHS labelling
| Pictograms | (GHS02: Flammable) (GHS07: Exclamation mark) (GHS08: Health hazard) |
| Signal word | Danger |
| Hazard statements | H225, H302, H312, H319, H332, H350 |
| Precautionary statements | P201, P202, P210, P233, P240, P241, P242, P243, P261, P264, P270, P271, P280, P281, P301+P312, P302+P352, P303+P361+P353, P304+P312, P304+P340, P305+P351+P338, P308+P313, P312, P322, P330, P337+P313, P363, P370+P378, P403+P235, P405, P501 |
| NFPA 704 (fire diamond) | 3 3 2 |
| Flash point | 0 °C (32 °F; 273 K) (open cup) |
- NIOSH (US health exposure limits)
| PEL (Permissible) | OSHA-Regulated Carcinogen, no PEL |
| REL (Recommended) | Carcinogenic |
| IDLH (Immediate danger) | N.D. |
| Safety data sheet (SDS) | Safety Data Sheet Archived |
- Except where otherwise noted, data are given for materials in their standard state (at 25 °C [77 °F], 100 kPa). verify (what is ?) Infobox references

Chloromethyl methyl ether (CMME) is a compound with formula CH_{3}OCH_{2}Cl. A colorless liquid, it is a chloroalkyl ether. It is used as an alkylating agent. In organic synthesis, it is used for introducing the methoxymethyl ether (MOM) protecting group, and is thus often called MOM-Cl or MOM chloride. It also finds application as a chloromethylating agent in some variants of the Blanc chloromethylation.

== Preparation ==
A convenient synthesis of chloromethyl methyl ether in situ involves the reaction of dimethoxymethane and acetyl chloride in the presence of a Lewis acid catalyst This route affords a methyl acetate solution of chloromethyl methyl ether of high purity. A similar method, using a high-boiling acyl chloride, can be used to prepare pure, dimethoxymethane being the only contaminant. In contrast, the classical procedure reported in Organic Syntheses employing formaldehyde, methanol, and hydrogen chloride yields material significantly contaminated with the dangerous bis(chloromethyl) ether and requires fractional distillation.

== Safety ==
The amount of time required to destroy residual chloromethyl methyl ether using various standard aqueous quench solutions (ammonium chloride solution, water, and sodium carbonate solution) has been measured. In all cases, a solution of chloromethyl methyl ether in toluene/methyl acetate was destroyed (to within detection limit) after vigorous stirring with the quench solution for 15 minutes.

CMME is a known human carcinogen. Chronic exposure can increase the incidence of respiratory cancers, including small cell carcinoma. It is one of 13 chemicals regulated by the Occupational Safety and Health Administration despite not having an established permissible exposure limit.

It is classified as an extremely hazardous substance in the United States as defined in Section 302 of the U.S. Emergency Planning and Community Right-to-Know Act (42 U.S.C. 11002), and is subject to strict reporting requirements by facilities which produce, store, or use it in significant quantities. It listed in Schedule 1 Part 1 of Canada's Prohibition of Certain Toxic Substances Regulations.

== Applications ==
CMME has known uses in medicinal chemistry. Such examples include Mepixanox (Pimexone) syntnthesis, Terbequinil, SIR 117 [107-30-2], SIR 109 [69319-52-4] & CPG 147 [41695-46-9].
