= Outline of organic chemistry =

Overview of and topical guide to organic chemistry

The following outline is provided as an overview of and topical guide to organic chemistry:

Organic chemistry is the scientific study of the structure, properties, composition, reactions, and preparation (by synthesis or by other means) of carbon-based compounds, hydrocarbons, and their derivatives. These compounds may contain any number of other elements, including hydrogen, nitrogen, oxygen, the halogens as well as phosphorus, silicon, and sulfur.

== General topics ==
- History of organic chemistry
- IUPAC nomenclature of organic chemistry
- Organic reaction
- Organic compound
- Organic synthesis
  - Retrosynthetic analysis

== Current trends ==
Current trends in organic chemistry include (as of 2020):

- Biocatalysis
- Biomimetics
- Catalysis
- Chemosensors
- Chiral synthesis
- Flow chemistry
- Green chemistry
- Mechanochemistry
- Photoredox catalysis

== Concepts ==
- Acids and bases
  - Brønsted–Lowry acid–base theory
  - Acid dissociation constants
  - Lewis acids and bases
- Chemoselectivity
- Molecular structure
  - Aromaticity
  - Chemical bonding
    - Covalent bonding
    - Lewis model
    - Molecule shapes
    - Bond angles
    - Resonance structures
  - Conjugated systems
  - Functional groups
  - Stereochemistry
    - Conformational isomerism
    - Diastereomer
    - Stereoisomerism
    - Chirality
    - Optical activity
    - Enantiomers
- Regioselectivity
- Stereoselectivity
- Spectroscopy
  - Infrared spectroscopy
  - Mass spectrometry
  - NMR spectroscopy
  - Ultraviolet–visible spectroscopy
- Supramolecular chemistry
  - Dynamic covalent chemistry
  - Host–guest chemistry
  - Mechanically-interlocked molecular architectures
  - Molecular folding
  - Molecular self-assembly
- Organometallic chemistry

== Chemical species ==
- Acetals
  - Hemiacetals
  - Thioacetals
  - Ketals
- Acid Anhydrides
- Acyl Halides
  - Acyl Chlorides
- Alcohols
  - Diols
    - Geminal Diols
    - Vicinal Diols
  - Fatty Alcohols
  - Silanols
  - Thiols
  - Triols
- Aldehydes
  - Aldols
- Alkanes
  - Alkoxides
  - Cycloalkanes
  - Haloalkanes
  - Nitroalkanes
- Alkenes
  - Vinylidenes
- Alkynes
  - Enediynes
- Amides
  - Amidines
  - Lactams
  - Sulfinamides
  - Sulfonamides
    - Sultams
- Amines
  - Aminals
  - Amino Acids
  - Fatty Amines
  - Hemiaminals
  - Nitrosamines
  - Polyamines
  - Sulfinylamines
- Azides
- Brønsted Acids
  - Superacids
- Carbamates
  - Thiocarbamates
    - Dithiocarbamates
- Carbohydrates
  - Monosaccharides
  - Disaccharides
  - Oligosaccharides
  - Polysaccharides
- Carbonates
  - Carbonate Esters
  - Dicarbonates
  - Polycarbonates
  - Thiocarbonates
  - Tricarbonates
- Carboxylic Acids
  - Carboxylates
- Cyanates
  - Thiocyanates
    - Isothiocyanates
- Dicarbonyls
- Disulfides
- Enals
- Enamines
- Enols
  - Enolates
- Esters
  - Lactones
  - Sulfonates
  - Thioesters
  - Thiolactones
- Ethers
  - Epoxides
  - Silyl Ethers
  - Thioethers
- Glycosides
- Glycosylamines
- Heterocyclic Arenes (Aromatics)
  - Benzofurans
  - Benzothiophenes
  - Carbazoles
  - Furans
  - Imidazoles
  - Indoles
  - Indolizines
  - Isoquinolines
  - Olympicenes
  - Oxazoles
  - Purines
    - Xanthines
  - Pyrans
  - Pyrazoles
  - Pyrazines
  - Pyridazines
  - Pyridines
  - Pyrimidines
  - Pyrroles
  - Quinolines
  - Thiazoles
  - Thiophenes
  - Thiopyrans
  - Xanthenes
    - Thioxanthenes
  - Xanthones
- Heterocyclic Compounds (Non-Aromatic)
  - Aziridines
  - Azetidines
  - Benzoquinones
  - Diazirines
  - Diaziridines
  - Dioxanes
  - Morpholines
  - Oxanes
  - Oxetanes
  - Oxiranes
  - Oxolanes
  - Piperidines
  - Pyrrolidines
  - Quinones
  - Thianes
  - Thietanes
  - Thiiranes
  - Thiolanes
- Imines
  - Oximes
    - Amidoximes
    - Aldoximes
    - Ketoximes
  - Schiff Bases
- Imides
- Ketones
  - Enones
- Ketenes
- Lipids
  - Eicosanoids
    - Eoxins
    - Isoprostanes
    - Leukotrienes
    - Lipoxins
    - Prostacyclins
    - Prostanoids
    - Resolvins
    - Thromboxanes
  - Fatty Acids
    - Saturated Fatty Acids
    - Unsaturated Fatty Acids
    - Monounsaturated Fatty Acids
    - Polyunsaturated Fatty Acids
  - Glycolipids
    - Glycoglycerolipids
    - Glycosphingolipids
      - Cerebrosides
      - Sulfatides
    - Gangliosides
    - Globosides
    - Glycophosphatidylinositols
  - Isoprenoids
  - Phospholipids
  - Sphingolipids
    - Ceramides
    - Sphingomyelins
  - Terpenes
    - Monoterpenes
    - Diterpenes
    - Triterpenes
    - Tetraterpenes
    - Sesquiterpenes
    - Sesterterpenes
    - Sesquarterpenes
  - Triglycerides
- Macrocyclic Compounds
  - Calixarenes
  - Corroles
  - Crown Ethers
  - Cyclodextrins
  - Fullerenes
  - Porphyrins
- Mechanically-Interlocked Molecular Architectures
  - Catenanes
  - Olympiadanes
  - Rotaxanes
- Monocyclic Arenes (Aromatics)
  - Acetophenones
  - Anilines
  - Anisoles
  - Aryl halides
  - Benzene
  - Benzaldehydes
  - Benzamides
  - Benzenesulfonic Acids
  - Benzoic acids
  - Benzophenones
  - Benzyl amines
  - Biphenyls
  - Catechols
  - Chalcones
  - Nitrobenzenes
  - Phenols
  - Thiophenols
  - Toluene
  - Tosylates
    - Brosylates
    - Nosylates
  - Xylenes
- Nitriles
- Nucleosides
- Nucleotides
  - Oligonucleotides
- Organometallic Compounds
  - Organoboranes
  - Organocuprates
  - Organolithiums
  - Organosilanes
- Organophosphate Compounds
  - Polyphosphates
  - Phosphazenes
    - Iminophosphoranes
    - Polyphosphazenes
  - Phosphinates
  - Phosphines
    - Diphosphines
  - Phosphinites
  - Phosphites
    - Phosphoramidites
  - Phosphonates
  - Phosphonites
  - Phosphoramidates
  - Phosphoramides
  - Phosphoranes
  - Thiophosphates
    - Phosphorothioate Nucleic Acids
- Peptides
  - Dipeptides
  - Tripeptides
  - Tetrapeptides
  - Pentapeptides
  - Polypeptides
- Peroxides
  - Alkenyl Peroxides
  - Peroxyacyl Nitrates
- Peroxy Acids
- Polycyclic Arenes (Aromatics)
  - Anthracenes
  - Chrysenes
  - Coronenes
  - Graphenes
  - Naphthalenes
  - Perylenes
  - Phenanthrenes
  - Pyrenes
  - Tetracenes
  - Triphenylenes
- Polycyclic Compounds (Non-Aromatic)
  - Cubanes
  - Propellanes
- Polymers
  - Copolymers
  - Graft Polymers
- Polyphenolic Compounds
  - Flavonoids
    - Anthocyanidins
    - Anthoxanthins
      - Flavones
      - Flavonols
    - Flavanones
    - Flavanonols
    - Flavans
    - Isoflavonoids
  - Lignans
  - Phenolic Acids
  - Stillbenes
  - Tannins
- Steroids
  - Androstanes
  - Cholanes
  - Cholestanes
  - Estranes
  - Pregnanes
  - Sterols
- Sulfoxides
- Surfactants
- Transition Metal Complexes
  - Transition Metal Aldehyde Complexes
  - Transition Metal Alkene Complexes
  - Transition Metal Arene Complexes
  - Transition Metal Azide Complexes
  - Transition Metal Carbene Complexes
  - Transition Metal Carboxylate Complexes
  - Transition Metal Carbyne Complexes
  - Transition Metal Dithiocarbamates Complexes
  - Transition Metal Ketone Complexes
  - Transition Metal Pyridine Complexes
  - Transition Metal Thiocyanate Complexes
  - Transition Metal Thiolate Complexes
  - Transition Metal Vinylidene Complexes
- Xanthates
- Ylides

== Reactions ==
=== Addition Reactions ===
- Electrophilic Addition Reactions
  - Halogen addition reactions
  - Hydration reactions
    - Kucherov reaction
    - Mukaiyama hydration
  - Hydroboration-oxidation reactions
    - Brown hydroboration reaction
  - Hydrohalogenations
  - Noyori asymmetric hydrogenation
  - Oxymercuration reactions
  - Ritter reaction
  - Schwartz hydrozirconation
  - Simmons-Smith reaction
- Nucleophilic Addition Reactions
  - Aldol Addition
    - Mukaiyama reaction
  - Barbier reaction
  - Baylis-Hillman reaction
  - Blaise reaction
  - Corey-Chaykovsky reaction
  - Cyanohydrin reaction
  - Grignard reaction
  - Horner-Wadsworth-Emmons reaction
  - Mannich reaction
  - Michael 1,2-addition
  - Peterson olefination
  - Pinner reaction
  - Reformatsky reaction
  - Thorpe reaction
  - Wittig reaction
- Nucleophilic Conjugate Addition Reactions
  - Michael 1,4-addition
  - Stetter reaction
  - Stork enamine alkylation

=== Annulation Reactions ===
- Danheiser annulation
- Robinson annulation

=== Chemical Tests ===
- Barfoed's test
- Bayer test
- Benedict's test
- Biuret test
- Fehling's test
- Molisch's test
- Ninhydrin test
- Schiff test
- Seliwanoff's test
- Tollen's test

=== Condensation Reactions ===
- Acyloin condensation
- Aldol condensation
- Benzoin condensation
- Claisen condensation
- Claisen-Schmidt condensation
- Darzens condensation
- Dieckmann condensation
- Fischer-Speier esterification
- Guareschi-Thorpe condensation
- Japp-Maitland condensation
- Knoevenagel condensation
- Pechmann condensation
- Rap-Stoermer condensation
- Stetter reaction
- Stobbe condensation
- Ullmann condensation
- Weiss-Cook condensation
- Yamaguchi esterification
- Ziegler condensation

=== Coupling Reactions ===
- Azo coupling
- Buchwald-Hartwig coupling
- Cadiot-Chodkiewicz coupling
- Castro-Stephens coupling
- Chan-Lam coupling
- Eglinton coupling
- Fukuyama coupling
- Glaser coupling
- Hay coupling
- Heck reaction
- Hiyama coupling
- Hirao coupling
- Kumada coupling
- Larock indole synthesis
- Liebeskind-Srogl coupling
- McMurry reaction
- Miyaura borylation
- Negishi coupling
- Phosphonium coupling
- Pinacol coupling
- Prins reaction
- Pschorr reaction
- Scholl reaction
- Sonogashira coupling
- Stille coupling
- Suzuki coupling
- Ugi coupling
- Ullmann coupling
- Wurtz coupling

=== Cyclization Reactions ===
- Bergman cyclization
- Borsche-Drechsel cyclization
- Bradsher cyclization
- Fukuyama indole synthesis
- Nazarov cyclization
- Robinson-Gabriel synthesis
- Simonis chromone cyclization
- Volhard-Erdmann cyclization

=== Cycloaddition Reactions ===
- 1,3-Dipolar cycloaddition
  - Azide-alkyne Huisgen cycloaddition
- Diels–Alder reaction
- Nitrone-olefin (3+2) cycloaddition
- Staudinger ketene-imine cycloaddition

=== Degradation Reactions ===
- Barbier-Wieland degradation
- Bergmann degradation
- Curtius degradation
- Darapsky degradation
- Edman degradation
- Emde degradation
- Gallagher-Hollander degradation
- Grignard degradation
- Hofmann degradation
- Ruff-Fenton degradation
- Schmidt degradation
- Strecker degradation
- Von Braun amide degradation
- Weerman degradation
- Wohl degradation

=== Disproportionation Reactions ===
- Cannizzaro Reaction

=== Elimination Reactions ===
- Beta elimination
- Chugaev elimination
- Cope elimination
- E1cB elimination reaction
- Hofmann elimination
- Solvolysis reaction

=== Epoxidation Reactions ===
- Jacobsen-Katsuki epoxidation
- Prilezhaev reaction
- Sharpless epoxidation
- Shi asymmetric epoxidation

=== Fragmentation Reactions ===
- Beckmann fragmentation
- Eschenmoser fragmentation
- Grob fragmentation

=== Free Radical Reactions ===
- Barton decarboxylation
- Barton-McCombie deoxygenation
- Barton nitrile ester reaction
- Hofmann-Loffler reaction
- Hunsdiecker reaction
- Keck radical allylation
- Meerwein arylation
- Minisci reaction
- Sandmeyer reaction
- Wohl-Ziegler bromination

=== Halogenation Reactions ===
- Electrophilic halogenation
- Halogen addition reaction
- Free radical halogenation
- Hell-Volhard-Zelinsky reaction
- Hunsdiecker reaction
- Ketone halogenation
- Kochi reaction

=== Heterocycle Formation Reactions ===
- Bartoli indole synthesis
- Biginelli reaction
- Bischler-Napieralski reaction
- Bischler-Mohlau indole synthesis
- Cadogan-Sundberg indole synthesis
- Ciamician-Dennstedt rearrangement
- Combes quinolone synthesis
- Dimroth rearrangement
- Feist-Benary furan synthesis
- Fischer indole synthesis
- Fukuyama indole synthesis
- Gassman indole synthesis
- Gutknecht pyrazine synthesis
- Hantzsch dihydropyridine synthesis
- Hantzsch pyrrole synthesis
- Hegedus indole synthesis
- Heine reaction
- Hemetsberger indole synthesis
- Hetero Diels-Alder reaction
- Hinsburg oxindole synthesis
- Hofmann-Loffler-Freytag reaction
- Knorr pyrrole synthesis
- Knorr pyrazole synthesis
- Krohnke pyridine synthesis
- Larock indole synthesis
- Leimgruber-Batcho indole synthesis
- Madelung indole synthesis
- Nenitzescu indole synthesis
- Paal-Knorr pyrrole synthesis
- Paterno-Buchi reaction
- Pechmann pyrazole synthesis
- Petrenko-Kritschenko piperidone synthesis
- Pictet-Spengler reaction
- Piloty-Robinson pyrrole synthesis
- Pomeranz-Fritsch reaction
- Reissert indole synthesis
- Skraup reaction
- Staedel-Rugheimer pyrazine synthesis
- Von Pechmann reaction

=== Homologation Reactions ===
- Arndt-Eistert reaction
- Corey-Fuchs reaction

=== Metathesis Reactions ===
- Cross metathesis
- Enyne metathesis
- Olefin metathesis
- Ring closing metathesis
- Ring opening metathesis

=== Organometallic Reactions ===
- Synthesis of Organometallic Reagents
  - Grignard reagents
  - Gilman reagents
  - Reformatsky reagents
- Associative substitution
- β-hydride elimination
- Carbometalation
- Carbon-hydrogen bond activation
- Cyclometalation
- Dissociative substitution
- Electron transfer
- Hydrometalation
- Migratory insertion
- Nucleophilic abstraction
- Oxidative addition
- Reductive elimination
- Transmetalation

=== Oxidation Reactions ===
- Alcohol oxidation
- Andrussov oxidation
- Baeyer-Villiger oxidation
- Boyland-Sims oxidation
- Corey-Gilman-Ganem oxidation
- Corey-Kim oxidation
- Dakin oxidation
- Davis oxidation
- Dess-Martin oxidation
- Elbs oxidation
- Fetizon oxidation
- Fleming-Tamao oxidation
- Ganem oxidation
- Hass-Bender oxidation
- Jones oxidation
- Kornblum oxidation
- Krohnke oxidation
- Lemieux-Johnson oxidation
- Ley oxidation
- Malaprade reaction
- Nucleophilic epoxidation
- Oppenauer oxidation
- Parikh-Doering oxidation
- Pfitzner-Moffatt oxidation
- Pinnick oxidation
- Prilezhaev reaction
- Riley oxidation
- Rubottom oxidation
- Saegusa-Ito oxidation
- Sarett oxidation
- Schmidt reaction
- Seyferth-Gilbert homologation
- Sommelet reaction
- Stahl oxidation
- Swern oxidation
- Tamao oxidation
- Tollens oxidation
- Wacker-Tsuji oxidation

=== Pericyclic Reactions ===
- Cheletropic reaction
- Dyotropic reaction
- Electrocyclic reaction
- Group transfer reaction
- Sigmatropic reaction

=== Polymerization Reactions ===
- Cationic polymerization
- Anionic polymerization
- Radical polymerization
- Ring-opening polymerization

=== Rearrangement Reactions ===
- Allylic rearrangement
- Amadori rearrangement
- Aston-Greenburg rearrangement
- Aza-Cope rearrangement
- Baeyer-Villiger rearrangement
- Baker–Venkataraman rearrangement
- Bamberger rearrangement
- Beckmann rearrangement
- Bellus-Claisen rearrangement
- Benzidine rearrangement
- Benzilic acid rearrangement
- Brook rearrangement
- Carroll rearrangement
- Chapman rearrangement
- Ciamician-Dennstedt rearrangement
- Claisen rearrangement
- Cope rearrangement
- Cornforth rearrangement
- Criegee rearrangement
- Curtius rearrangement
- Demjanov rearrangement
- Dienol-benzene rearrangement
- Dienone-phenol rearrangement
- Dimroth rearrangement
- Di-π-methane rearrangement
- Favorskii rearrangement
- Ferrier reaction
- Fischer-Hepp rearrangement
- Fries rearrangement
- Fritsch-Buttenberg-Wiechell rearrangement
- Gabriel-Colman rearrangement
- Hayashi rearrangement
- Hock rearrangement
- Hofmann rearrangement
- Hofmann-Martius rearrangement
- Homo-rearrangement of steroids
- Ireland–Claisen rearrangement
- Jacobsen rearrangement
- Johnson-Claisen rearrangement
- Kornblum-DeLaMare rearrangement
- Lossen rearrangement
- McLafferty rearrangement
- Meisenheimer rearrangement
- Metal-ion-catalyzed σ-bond rearrangement
- Meyer-Schuster rearrangement
- Mislow-Evans rearrangement
- Nametkin rearrangement
- Neber rearrangement
- Newman–Kwart rearrangement
- Orton rearrangement
- Overman rearrangement
- Oxy-Cope rearrangement
- Payne rearrangement
- Perkin rearrangement
- Piancatelli rearrangement
- Pinacol rearrangement
- Pummerer rearrangement
- Reilly-Hickinbottom rearrangement
- Retropinacol rearrangement
- Rupe rearrangement
- Semidine rearrangement
- Smiles rearrangement
- Sommelet-Hauser rearrangement
- Stevens rearrangement
- Stieglitz rearrangement
- Tafel rearrangement
- Tiemann rearrangement
- Tiffeneau-Dernjanov rearrangement
- Truce-Smiles rearrangement
- Wagner-Meerwein rearrangement
- Wallach rearrangement
- Wessely-Moser rearrangement
- Westphalen-Lettre rearrangement
- Willgerodt rearrangement
- Wittig rearrangement
  - 1,2-Wittig rearrangement
  - 2,3-Wittig rearrangement
- Wolff rearrangement
- Von Richter reaction

=== Reduction Reactions ===
- Bechamp reduction
- Birch reduction
- Bouveault-Blanc reduction
- Carbonyl reduction
- CBS reduction
- Clemmensen reduction
- Corey-Bakshi-Shibata reduction
- Corey–Itsuno reduction
- DIBAL-H selective reduction
- Evans-Saksena reduction
- Evans-Tishchenko reaction
- Eschweiler-Clarke reaction
- Fukuyama reduction
- Luche reduction
- Marko-Lam deoxygenation
- Meerwein-Ponndorf-Verley reduction
- Midland Alpine borane reduction
- Mozingo reduction
- Narasaka-Prasad reduction
- Noyori asymmetric hydrogenation
- Rosenmund reduction
- Staudinger reduction
- Stephen aldehyde synthesis
- Tishchenko reaction
- Wolff-Kishner reduction
- Zinin reduction

=== Substitution Reactions ===
- Electrophilic Aliphatic Substitution Reactions
  - Carbene C–H insertion
  - Carbonyl α-substitution reaction
  - Dizaonium coupling
  - Keto-enol tautomerism
  - Ketone halogenation
  - Nitrosation
- Electrophilic Aromatic Substitution (EAS) Reactions
  - Bischler-Napieralski synthesis
  - Blanc halomethylation
  - Combes synthesis
  - Friedel-Crafts acylation
  - Friedel-Crafts alkylation
  - Fries rearrangement
  - Gatterman reaction
  - Houben-Hoesch reaction
  - Kolbe-Schmitt reaction
  - Lehmstedt-Tanasescu reaction
  - Pechmann condensation
  - Pictet-Spengler reaction
  - Pomeranz-Fritsch reaction
  - Quelet reaction
  - Reimer-Tiemann reaction
  - Tscherniac-Einhorn reaction
  - Vilsmeier-Haack reaction
  - Von Pechmann reaction
- Nucleophilic Acyl Substitution (S_{N}Acyl) Reactions
  - Fischer esterification
- Nucleophilic Aromatic Substitution (S_{N}Ar) Reactions
  - Balz-Schiemann reaction
  - Bamberger rearrangement
  - Chichibabin reaction
  - Smiles rearrangement
  - Vicarious nucleophilic substitution
- Nucleophilic Substitution (S_{N}) Reactions
  - Baeyer-Villiger oxidation
  - Delépine reaction
  - Dess-Martin oxidation
  - Ferrier rearrangement
  - Finkelstein reaction
  - Gabriel synthesis
  - Kolbe nitrile synthesis
  - Michaelis-Arbuzov reaction
  - Mitsunobu reaction
  - Perkow reaction
  - Sandmeyer reaction
  - Sharpless asymmetric dihydroxylation
  - Sharpless oxyamination
  - Solvolysis reaction
    - Pinner reaction
  - Swern oxidation
  - Tishchenko reaction
  - Wacker oxidation
  - Wenker synthesis
  - Williamson ether synthesis
- Radical Substitution
  - Minisci reaction

== See also ==
- Important publications in organic chemistry
- List of organic reactions
