= Bischler =

Bischler is a surname. Notable people with the surname include:

- August Bischler (1865–1957), Russian-born German chemist
- Beate Bischler (born 1968), retired German Paralympic judoka
- Hélène Bischler (1932–2005), French botanist and bryologist

== See also ==
- Bischler–Möhlau indole synthesis, a chemical reaction
- Bischler–Napieralski reaction, an organic reaction
