= Johannes Thiele =

Johannes Thiele may refer to:

- Johannes Thiele (zoologist)
- Johannes Thiele (chemist)
