= Wittig rearrangement =

Wittig rearrangement may refer to:

- 1,2-Wittig rearrangement
- 2,3-Wittig rearrangement
