= Tohru Fukuyama =

Japanese chemist

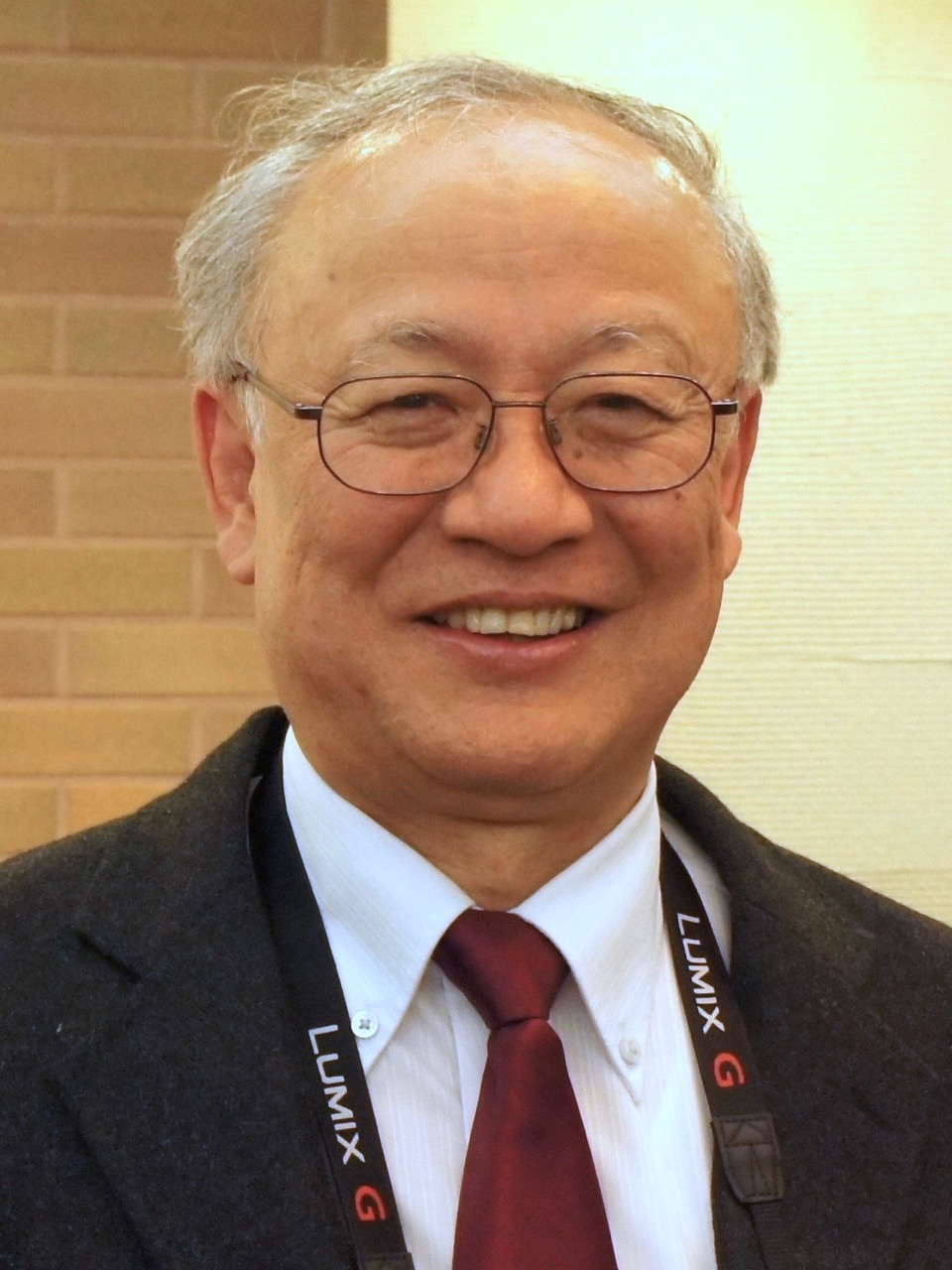
- Tohru Fukuyama
- Born: August 9, 1948 (age 78); Anjō, Aichi, Japan
- Education: Nagoya University; Harvard University
- Known for: Fukuyama coupling
- Scientific career
- Workplaces: Harvard University; Rice University; University of Tokyo
- Thesis: The total synthesis of gliotoxin (1977)
- Doctoral advisor: Yoshito Kishi

Tohru Fukuyama (福山 透, Fukuyama Tōru; born 9 August 1948) is a Japanese organic chemist and Professor of Chemistry at University of Tokyo in Japan. He discovered the Fukuyama coupling in 1998.

== Biography ==
Fukuyama studied chemistry at Nagoya University with degrees Bachelor's (1971) and Master's (1973) degrees. As a graduate student, he then worked at Harvard University, where he received his doctorate in 1977 as an academic student of Yoshito Kishi. Until 1978, he continued his research as a postdoc in the Department of Chemistry of Harvard University and then moved to Rice University as an assistant professor, where in 1988 he obtained the rank of a chair holder. In 1995, he accepted a professorship in Pharmaceutical Sciences from the University of Tokyo, Japan. Since 2013, Fukuyama has been working as a professor at the Nagoya University - more precisely: Designated Professor of Pharmaceutical Sciences.

The 2015 Nobel Prize in Physiology or Medicine winner Satoshi Ōmura is his old friend.

== Achievements ==
- Fukuyama reduction
- Fukuyama indole synthesis
- Fukuyama coupling

== Selected publications ==
- Practical Total Synthesis of (±)-Mitomycin C, T. Fukuyama and L.-H. Yang, J. Am. Chem. Soc., 111, 8303–8304 (1989).
- Facile Reduction of Ethyl Thiol Esters to Aldehydes: Application to a Total Synthesis of (+)-Neothramycin A Methyl Ether, T. Fukuyama, S.-C. Lin, and L.-P. Li, J. Am. Chem. Soc., 112, 7050–7051 (1990).
- Total Synthesis of (+)-Leinamycin, Y. Kanda and T. Fukuyama, J. Am. Chem. Soc., 115, 8451–8452 (1993).
- 2- and 4-Nitrobenzenesulfonamides: Exceptionally Versatile Means for Preparation of Secondary Amines and Protection of Amines, T. Fukuyama, C.-K. Jow, and M. Cheung, Tetrahedron Lett., 36, 6373–6374 (1995).
- “Radical Cyclization of 2-Alkenylthioanilides: A Novel Synthesis of 2,3-Disubstituted Indoles,” H. Tokuyama, T. Yamashita, M. T. Reding, Y. Kaburagi, and T. Fukuyama, J. Am. Chem. Soc., 121, 3791–3792 (1999).
- Stereocontrolled Total Synthesis of (+)-Vinblastine, S. Yokoshima, T. Ueda, S. Kobayashi, A. Sato, T. Kuboyama, H. Tokuyama, and T. Fukuyama, J. Am. Chem. Soc., 124, 2137–2139 (2002).
- Total Synthesis of (+)-Yatakemycin, K. Okano, H. Tokuyama, and T. Fukuyama, J. Am. Chem. Soc., 128, 7136–7137 (2006).
- A Practical Synthesis of (–)-Oseltamivir, N. Satoh, T. Akiba, S. Yokoshima, and T. Fukuyama, Angew. Chem. Int. Ed., 46, 5734–5736 (2007).
- A Practical Synthesis of (–)-Kainic Acid, S. Takita, S. Yokoshima, and T. Fukuyama, Org. Lett., 13, 2068–2070 (2011).
- Total Synthesis of Ecteinascidin 743, F. Kawagishi, T. Toma, T. Inui, S. Yokoshima, and T. Fukuyama, J. Am. Chem. Soc., 135, 13684–13687 (2013).
