= Melting-point apparatus =

Scientific instrument

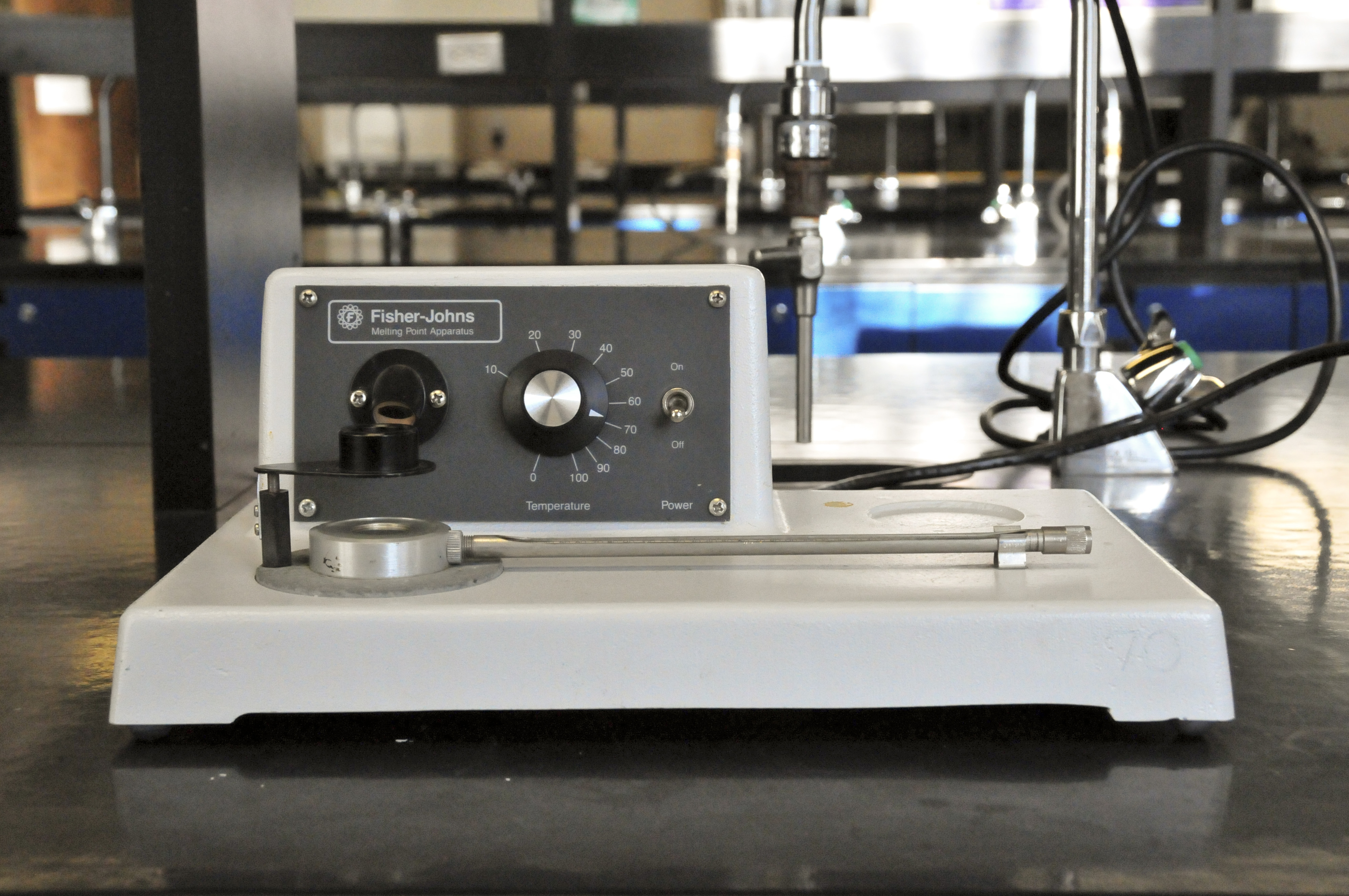
A Fisher–Johns apparatus

A melting-point apparatus is a scientific instrument used to determine the melting point of a substance. Some types of melting-point apparatuses include the Thiele tube, Fisher-Johns apparatus, Gallenkamp (Electronic) melting-point apparatus and automatic melting-point apparatus.

== Design ==
While the outward designs of apparatuses can vary greatly, most apparatuses use a sample loaded into a sealed capillary tube (melting-point tube), which is then placed in the apparatus. The sample is then heated, either by a heating block or an oil bath, and as the temperature increases, the sample is observed to determine when the phase change from solid to liquid occurs. The operator of the apparatus records the temperature range starting with the initial phase-change temperature and ending with the completed phase-change temperature. The temperature range that is determined can then be averaged to gain the melting point of the sample being examined.

Apparatuses usually have a control panel that allows the starting and final temperatures, as well as the temperature gradient (in units per minute), to be programmed. Some machines have several channels, which permit more than one sample to be tested at a time. The control panel might have buttons that allow the start and end of the melting point range to be recorded.

=== Thiele tube ===
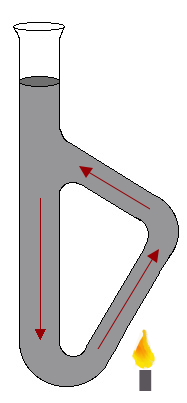
Thiele tube

A Thiele tube is a glass instrument that is filled with oil heated by using an open flame. The sample is placed in the opening in a melting-point tube alongside a thermometer and heated by the oil as the oil circulates through the Thiele tube. By using different oils, different temperature ranges can be reached and used to determine melting points. The Thiele tube may also be used to determine boiling points of liquid samples using the Siwoloboff method.
