= Siwoloboff method =

Laboratory technique

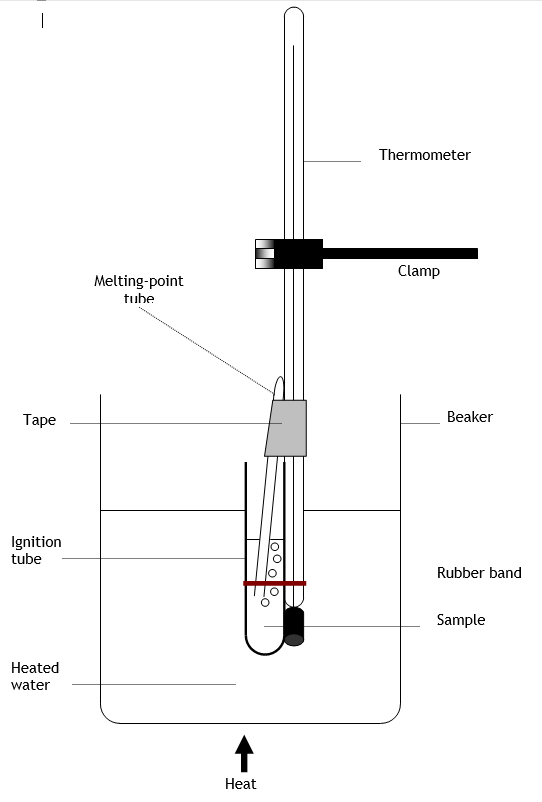
Diagram of apparatus for Siwoloboff method. Tape and/or rubber bands can be used for attachment. A Thiele tube is an alternative heating vessel.

The Siwoloboff method is used to determine the boiling point of small samples of liquid chemicals. A sample in an ignition tube (also called a fusion tube) is attached to a thermometer with a rubber band, and immersed in a Thiele tube, water bath, or other suitable medium for heating. A sealed capillary, open end pointing down, is placed in the ignition tube.

The apparatus is heated. Dissolved gases evolve from the sample first, and the air in the capillary tube expands. Once the sample starts to boil, heating is stopped, and the temperature starts to fall. The temperature at which the liquid sample is sucked into the sealed capillary is the boiling point of the sample.
