= Wohl–Aue reaction =

Chemical reaction

The Wohl–Aue reaction is an organic reaction between an aromatic nitro compound and an aniline to form a phenazine in presence of an alkali base. An example is the reaction between nitrobenzene and aniline:

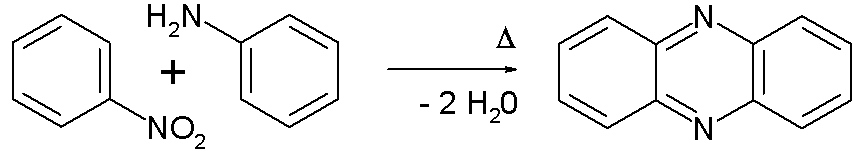
The Wohl-Aue reaction

The reaction is named after Alfred Wohl and W. Aue.
