= Hans von Pechmann =

German chemist (1850–1902)

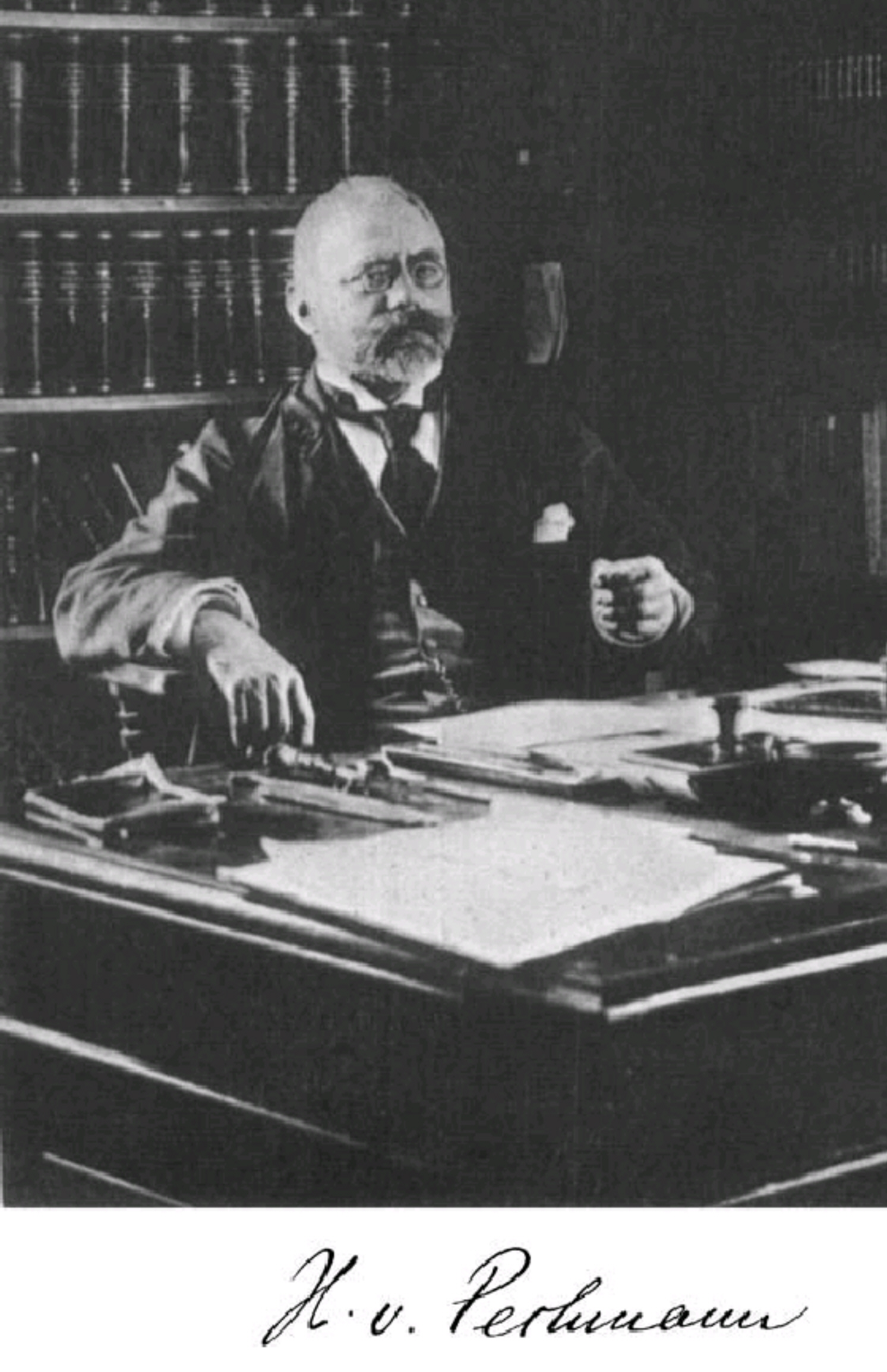
- Born: 1 April 1850; Nürnberg, Kingdom of Bavaria, German Empire
- Died: 19 April 1902 (aged 52); Tübingen, Kingdom of Württemberg, German Empire
- Education: University of Greifswald
- Known for: Pechmann condensation Diazomethane
- Scientific career
- Fields: organic chemistry
- Workplaces: Ludwig-Maximilians-Universität München; University of Tübingen
- Doctoral advisor: Heinrich Limpricht
- Doctoral students: William Hobson Mills Julius B. Cohen

Freiherr Hans von Pechmann (1 April 1850 – 19 April 1902) was a German chemist, renowned for his discovery of diazomethane in 1894. Pechmann condensation and Pechmann pyrazole synthesis. He also first prepared 1,2-diketones (e.g., diacetyl), acetonedicarboxylic acid, methylglyoxal and diphenyltriketone; established the symmetrical structure of anthraquinone.

Von Pechmann also produced the first example of solid polyethylene serendipitously in 1898, via the decomposition of diazomethane.

== Life ==
Von Pechmann was born in Nuremberg, the only son of a doctor, who was also named Hans. The von Pechmanns had distinguished themselves as soldiers; in 1702, von Pechmann's ancestor Martin Günther von Pechmann, a general of artillery in the Bavarian army, had been raised to the rank of a baron of the Holy Roman Empire by Leopold I. After studying with Heinrich Limpricht at the University of Greifswald he became professor at the Ludwig-Maximilians-Universität München until 1895. He was professor at the University of Tübingen from 1895 until his death. He killed himself by taking cyanide, aged 52.

== Works ==
- Volhard's Anleitung zur Qualitativen chemischen Analyse . Chemisches Labolatorium des Staates, Munich 9th & 10th ed. 1901 Digital edition by the University and State Library Düsseldorf
- Anleitung zur quantitativen Analyse nach Cl. Zimmermann: zum Gebrauche im chemischen Laboratorium des Staates zu München. Chemisches Laboratorium des Staates, Munich 10th ed. 1901 Digital edition by the University and State Library Düsseldorf

== See also ==
- German inventors and discoverers
