= Otto Dimroth =

German chemist

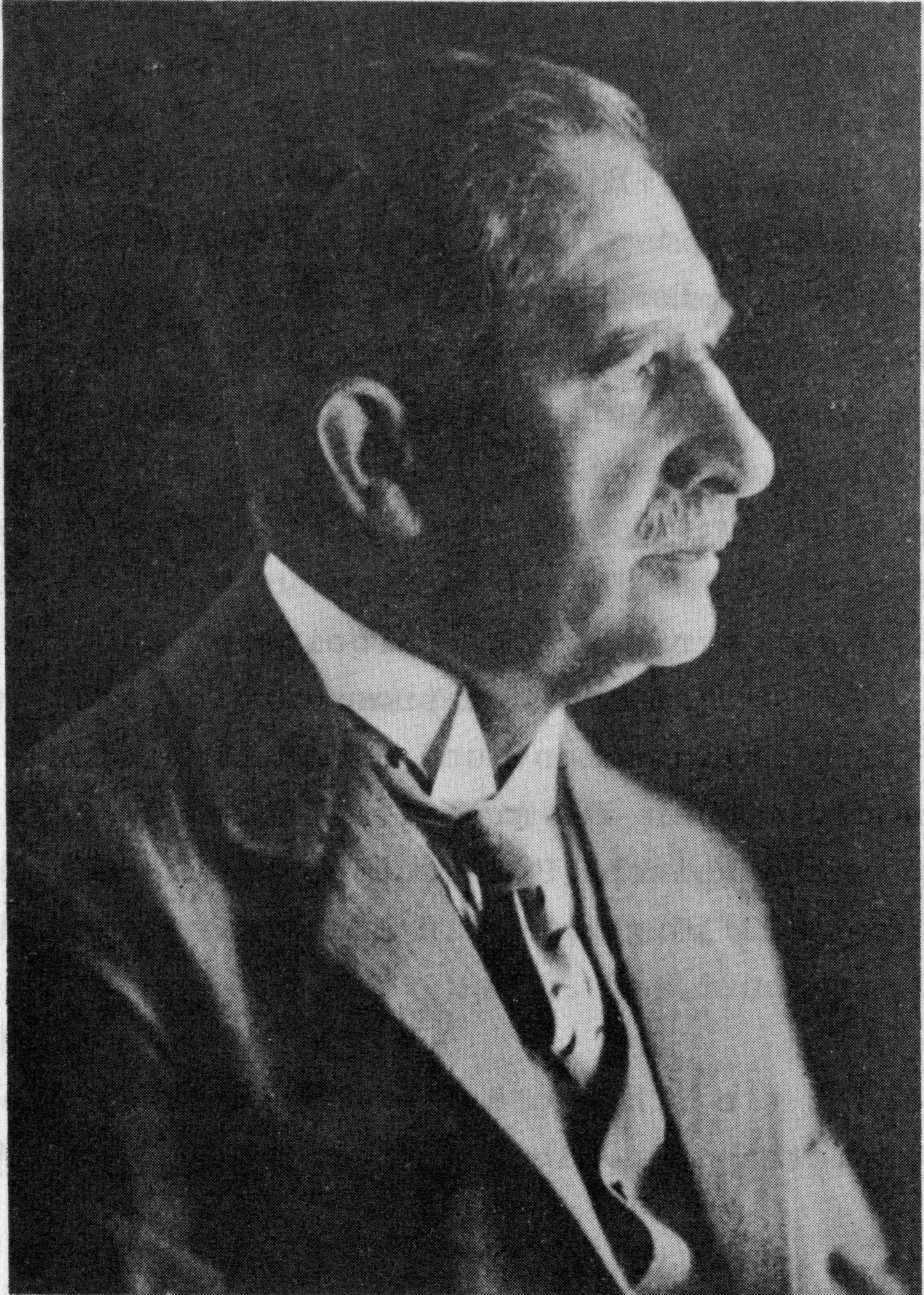
- Born: 28 March 1872; Bayreuth, German Empire
- Died: 16 May 1940 (aged 68); Aschaffenburg, Germany
- Scientific career
- Workplaces: University of Greifswald, Ludwig-Maximilians-Universität München, University of Würzburg
- Doctoral advisor: Johannes Thiele

Otto Dimroth (28 March 1872 – 16 May 1940) was a German chemist. He is known for the Dimroth rearrangement, as well as a type of condenser with an internal double spiral, the Dimroth condenser. He made pioneering contributions to organomercury chemistry.

His son Karl Dimroth was also a renowned chemist, who described the first synthesis of 3-benzoxepin.
