= Alfred Wohl =

German chemist (1863–1939)

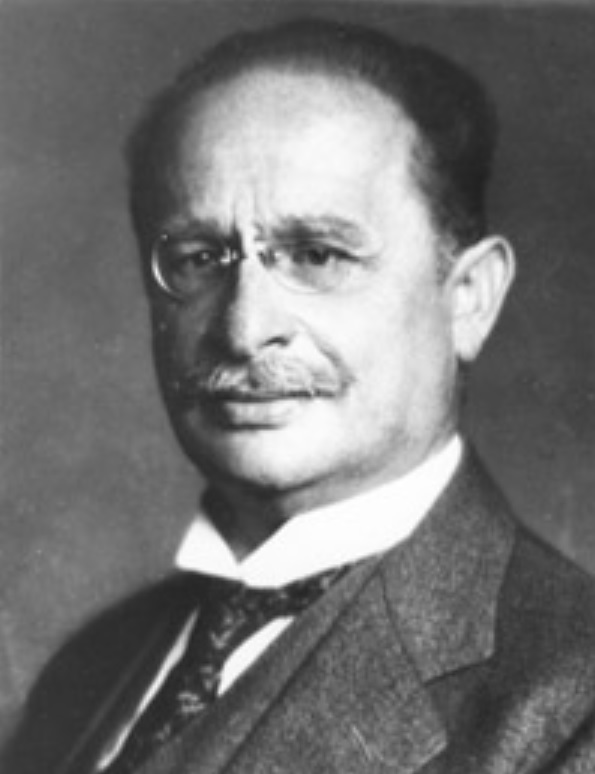
- Born: 3 October 1863; Graudenz, West Prussia, Prussia
- Died: 25 December 1939 (aged 76); Stockholm, Sweden
- Education: University of Heidelberg
- Known for: Wohl degradation, Wohl–Aue reaction, Wohl–Ziegler reaction
- Scientific career
- Workplaces: University of Berlin, Technische Hochschule Danzig
- Doctoral advisor: August Wilhelm von Hofmann

Alfred Wohl (3 October 1863 – 25 December 1939) was a German chemist. Several chemical reactions are named after him, including the Wohl degradation, Wohl–Aue reaction and the Wohl–Ziegler reaction.

== Life ==
Wohl studied chemistry at the University of Heidelberg from 1882 until 1886. He received his Ph.D 1886 for work on Hexamethylenetetramine with August Wilhelm von Hofmann. He became an assistant of Hermann Emil Fischer at the University of Berlin from 1886 until 1891, where he also received his habilitation. He became professor at the University of Berlin in 1901, but he left for the Technische Hochschule Danzig in 1904. He retired because of antisemitic pressure in 1933, but worked in his lab until 1937. He emigrated to Sweden in 1938, where he died in 1939.

His son Kurt Wohl (1896–1962) – who also became a renowned chemical scientist – emigrated to Great Britain in 1939 and some years later to the United States.

== Work ==
His work in organic chemistry started with his PhD thesis on hexamine in 1886. Under the influence of Fischer, Wohl focused on sugar chemistry. Wohl arbitrarily defined the structure of (+)-glyceraldehyde to have the D-configuration, forming the basis for the D-L system. This was done before chemists had the ability to prove (+)-glyceraldehyde was, in fact, D-glyceraldehyde. Before the invention of x-ray crystallography the exact determination of the configuration at a chiral carbon atom was impossible.

D-glyceraldehyde	L-glyceraldehyde
D-glyceraldehyde	L-glyceraldehyde

With this starting point, all related chiral compounds could be chemically transformed into (−)- or (+)-glyceraldehyde. By employing only chemical transformations with retention of stereochemical configuration, such an unknown chiral compound could be assigned either a D- or an L-configuration.

The use of vanadium pentoxide for the catalytic oxidation with air of various substances became his most profitable invention. Similar catalysts are still used for the oxidation of naphthalene, anthraquinone and for the production of sulfuric acid from sulfur dioxide.
