= One-pot synthesis =

Chemical synthesis strategy

One-pot preparation of 7-Hydroxyquinoline

In chemistry a one-pot synthesis is a strategy to improve the efficiency of a chemical reaction in which a reactant is subjected to successive chemical reactions in just one reactor. This is much desired by chemists because avoiding a lengthy separation process and purification of the intermediate chemical compounds can save time and resources while increasing chemical yield.

An example of a one-pot synthesis is the total synthesis of tropinone or the Gassman indole synthesis. Sequential one-pot syntheses can be used to generate even complex targets with multiple stereocentres, such as oseltamivir, which may significantly shorten the number of steps required overall and have important commercial implications.

A sequential one-pot synthesis with reagents added to a reactor one at a time and without work-up is also called a telescoping synthesis.

In one such procedure the reaction of 3-N-tosylaminophenol I with acrolein II affords a hydroxyl substituted quinoline III through 4 sequential steps without workup of the intermediate products (see image). The addition of acrolein (blue) is a Michael reaction catalyzed by N,N-diisopropylamine, the presence of ethanol converts the aldehyde group to an acetal but this process is reversed when hydrochloric acid is introduced (red). The enolate reacts as an electrophile in a Friedel-Crafts reaction with ring-closure. The alcohol group is eliminated in presence of potassium hydroxide (green) and when in the final step the reaction medium is neutralized to pH 7 (magenta) the tosyl group is eliminated as well.
