= August Bischler =

Russian-born German chemist (1865–1957)

- Born: 29 April 1865; Karlsruhe, Taurida Governorate, Russian Empire
- Died: 26 May 1957 (aged 92)
- Citizenship: German, Russian, Swiss
- Education: University of Zurich
- Known for: Bischler–Napieralski reaction
- Scientific career
- Workplaces: University of Zurich, University of Basel

August Bischler (29 April 1865 – 26 May 1957) was a Russian-born Crimea German chemist who later emigrated to Switzerland. He discovered the Bischler–Möhlau indole synthesis reaction in 1892 and, together with Bernard Napieralski, discovered the Bischler–Napieralski reaction in 1893.

== Life ==
He received his Ph.D. at the University of Zurich in 1889, worked at the University of Zurich, and from 1899 at the University of Basel. After becoming a Swiss citizen in 1925 he worked in the chemical industry in Geneva.

== Bernard Napieralski ==
Bernard Napieralski was a Ph.D. student of Bischler at the University of Zurich in 1893. Napieralski was born in Ostrowy, Poland, 1861.
