= Dyotropic reaction =

Chemical reaction

Dyotropic rearrangements of Type I (above) and Type II (below)

A dyotropic reaction (from the Greek dyo, meaning two) in organic chemistry is a type of organic reaction and more specifically a pericyclic valence isomerization in which two sigma bonds simultaneously migrate intramolecularly. The reaction type is of some relevance to organic chemistry because it can explain how certain reactions occur and because it is a synthetic tool in the synthesis of organic molecules for example in total synthesis. It was first described by Manfred T. Reetz in 1971 In a type I reaction two migrating groups interchange their relative positions and a type II reaction involves migration to new bonding sites without positional interchange.

== Type I rearrangements ==
In type I rearrangements (Y-A-B-X conversion to X-A-B-Y) the two migrating groups are oriented trans to each other and as a result of the rearrangement they migrate to opposite sides. The first example of a dyotropic rearrangement involving a carbon-carbon bond was reported by Cyril A. Grob and Saul Winstein. They observed the interconversion of 2 bromine atoms in a certain steroid.

In a straightforward example the two bromine atoms in 3-tert-butyl-trans-1,2-dibromohexane mutarotate by heating. In the transition state both bromine atoms connect symmetrically to both carbon atoms on opposite sides and the reaction is concerted. Stepwise mechanisms in dyotropic reactions have also been investigated.

In organic synthesis an important application is the conversion of 4-substituted-gamma-lactones to butyrolactones. Type I dyotropic rearrangements also occur around carbon-oxygen bonds, such as the thermal equilibration of (R_{3}Si^{1})R_{2}C-O-Si^{2}R_{3} to (R_{3}Si^{2})R_{2}C-O-Si^{1}R_{3}. The 1,2-Wittig rearrangement can also be considered an example of this reaction type. More dyotropic reactions are found involving N-O bonds and N-N bonds.

== Type II rearrangements ==
Type II rearrangements often involve double hydrogen migration in a carbon skeleton. This reaction type can be found in certain transfer hydrogenations. An example is hydrogen transfer in syn-sesquinorbornene disulfones.
