= Wohl–Ziegler bromination =

Type of chemical reaction

Named after	Alfred Wohl; Karl Ziegler
Reaction type	Substitution reaction

Identifiers
Organic Chemistry Portal	wohl-ziegler-reaction
RSC ontology ID	RXNO:0000225

The Wohl–Ziegler reaction is a chemical reaction that involves the allylic or benzylic bromination of hydrocarbons using an N-bromosuccinimide and a radical initiator.

Best yields are achieved with N-bromosuccinimide in carbon tetrachloride solvent. Several reviews have been published.

In a typical setup, a stoichiometric amount of N-bromosuccinimide solution and a small quantity of initiator are added to a solution of the substrate in CCl_{4}, and the reaction mixture is stirred and heated to the boiling point. Initiation of the reaction is indicated by more vigorous boiling; sometimes the heat source may need to be removed. Once all N-bromosuccinimide (which is denser than the solvent) has been converted to succinimide (which floats on top) the reaction has finished. Due to the high toxicity and ozone-depleting nature of carbon tetrachloride, trifluorotoluene has been proposed as an alternative solvent suitable for the Wohl–Ziegler bromination.

The corresponding chlorination reaction cannot generally be achieved with N-chlorosuccinimide, although more specialized reagents have been developed, and the reaction can be achieved industrially with chlorine gas.

== Mechanism ==
The Wohl–Ziegler reaction proceeds through a mechanism first proposed by Paul Goldfinger in 1953. An earlier mechanism proposed by George Bloomfield, though consistent with selectivity studies, proved overly simplistic.

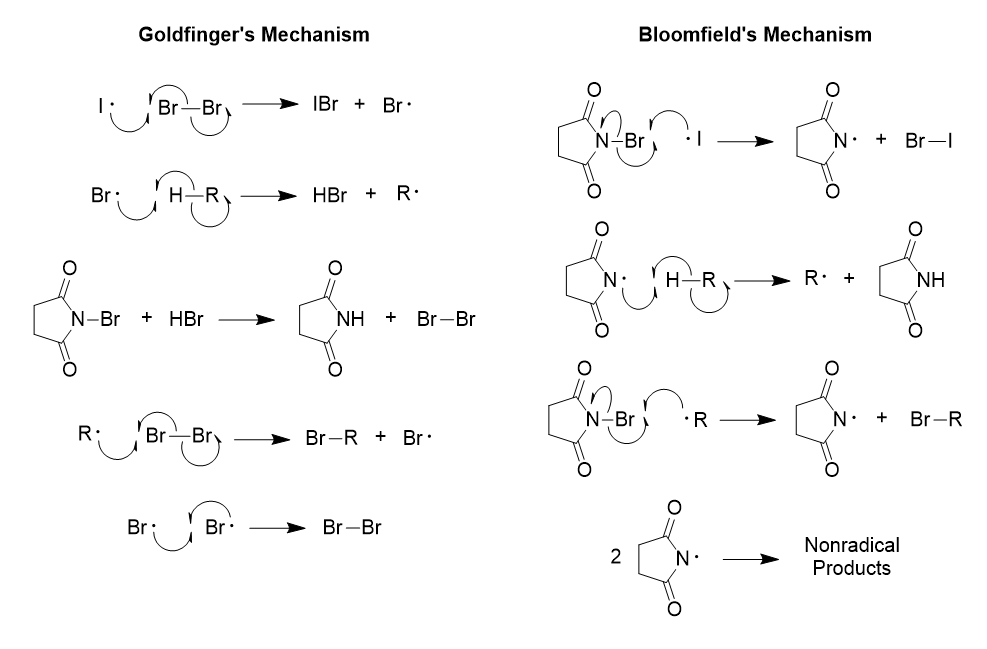

The key puzzle in mechanizing the Wohl–Ziegler reaction is the role of the succinimide moiety. Bloomfield's mechanism required direct NBS radicals. But the N–Br bond has dissociation energy much larger than that for Br_{2}, and rarely homolyzes like Bloomfield expected.

Goldfinger instead explains the necessity of succinimide through competing addition and substitution pathways. These pathways apply to almost all radical reactions, and a generic depiction (including side-reactions 6 and 8) is as follows:

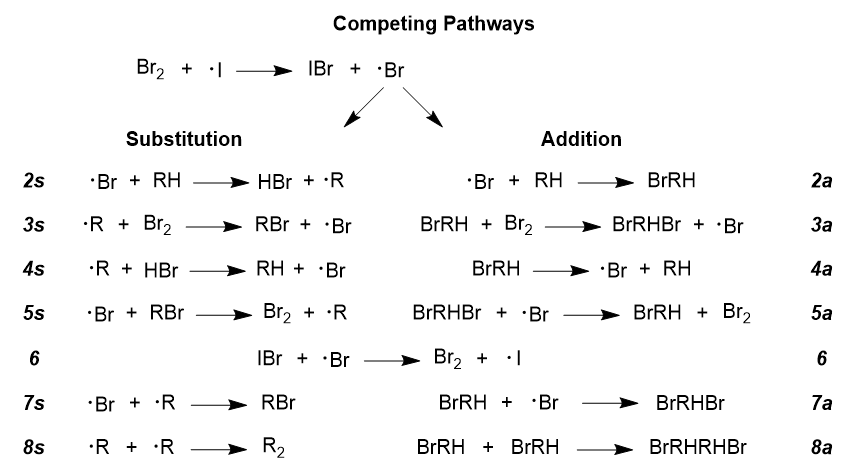

Relative rate laws describing each pathway depend strongly on the molecular bromine concentration. The limiting cases of high and low concentration are:

High bromine concentrations
r_{a}/r_{s} = k_{2a}/k_{2s}(1 + k_{4a}/k_{3a}[Br_{2}])
Low bromine concentrations
r_{a}/r_{s} = k_{2a}/k_{2s}k_{3a}/k_{4a}[Br_{2}]

where r_{a}/r_{s} is the ratio of addition to substitution, and the k values correspond to the rate constant for the labeled reaction step.

The desired bromination is the substitution product. As the above equations indicate, addition is suppressed as [Br_{2}] decreases. Goldfinger thus concludes that as NBS acts primarily as a bromine sink, promoting substitution through a very low Br_{2} concentration.

== See also ==
- Free-radical halogenation
