= Fukuyama indole synthesis =

Chemical organic reaction

The Fukuyama indole synthesis is a versatile tin mediated chemical reaction that results in the formation of 2,3-disubstituted indoles. A practical one-pot reaction that can be useful for the creation of disubstituted indoles. Most commonly tributyltin hydride is utilized as the reducing agent, with azobisisobutyronitrile (AIBN) as a radical initiator. Triethylborane can also be used as a radical initiator. The reaction can begin with either an ortho-isocyanostyrene or a 2-alkenylthioanilide derivative, both forming the indole through Radical cyclization via an α-stannoimidoyl radical. The R group can be a range of both basic and acidic sensitive functional groups such as esters, THP ethers, and β-lactams. In addition the reaction is not stereospecific, in that both the cis and trans isoform can be used to obtain the desired product.

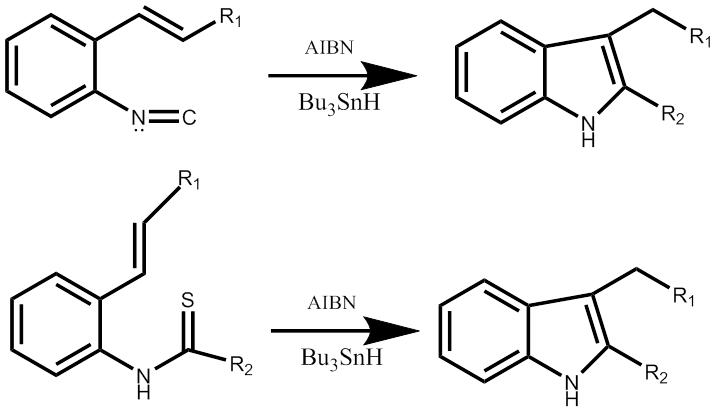
Fukuyama Indole Synthesis with either starting material.

== Mechanism ==
The reaction mechanism begins with the creation of the tributyl tin radical with either AIBN or triethylborane, not shown in either step-wise mechanism. Following the radical attacks the o-isocyano carbon creating the alpha-stannoimidoyl radical. Through radical cyclization a five membered ring is formed followed by the propagation of a new tin radical. The final step is dependent on the desired outcome of the reaction. This reaction is a one-pot synthesis and results in yields ranging from 50% to 98% depending on the substituent.

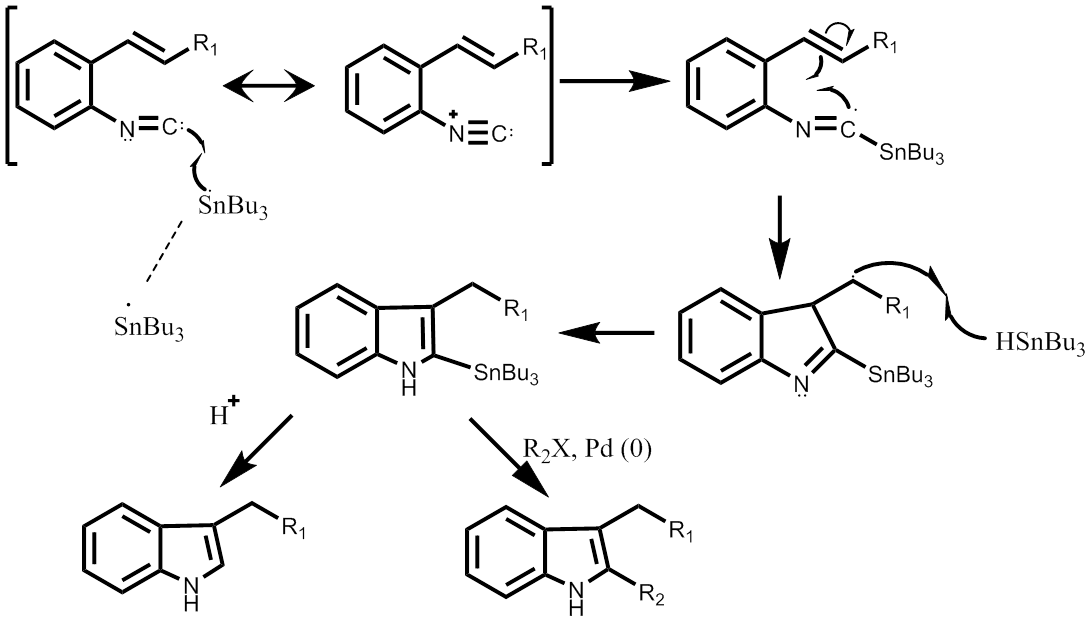
Step-wise mechanism of Fukuyama Indole Synthesis starting with the Isocyano substituent.

The mechanism using 2-alkenylthioanilide is very similar, also starting with the formation of a bond, now between the tin radical and the sulfur. Followed by a similar radical cyclization resulting in a five membered ring, a new tin radical is produced and the original attacking radical leaves with the sulfur substituent. This part of the step-wise mechanism has yet to be detailed. The reaction yield can range from 40% to 93% depending also on the desired substituent.

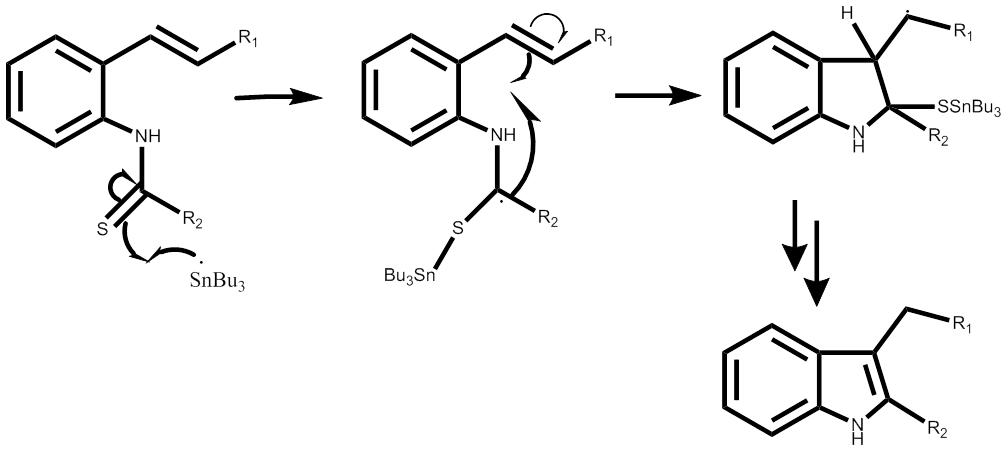
Step-wise mechanism of the Fukuyama Indole Synthesis starting with the alkenylthioanilide substituent.

== Derivatives ==
The Fukuyama Indole synthesis can generate a range of different substituents at the 2,3 position that were previously unattainable without a protecting group on the nitrogen in the ring. One such example is the 2-iodoindole derivative, which can then lead to a variety of N-unprotected 2,3 substituted indoles. Before the discovery of this compound the chemistry involving 2-stannylindoles was not developed as there was no way to practically synthesize these N-unprotected 2,3-stannylindoles. One was limited to the production of N-protected 2-stannylindoles through metalation by a process known as Stille coupling. The N-unprotected 2-stannylindoles generated from the Fukuyama Synthesis can be readily oxidized with iodine opening up an area of chemistry that allows for the synthesis of a variety compounds utilizing the 2-iodoindoles as a starting reagent. This iodine substituted derivative can lead to aryl halides, vinyl iodides, vinyl triflates, benzyl bromides.

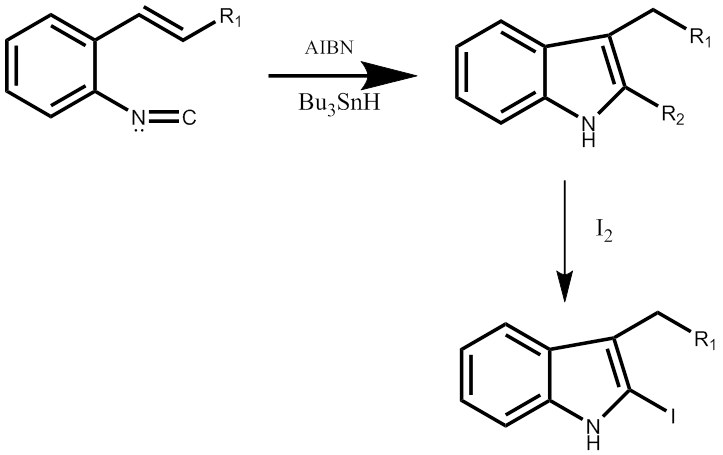
Example Reaction for Fukuyama Synthesis.

In addition to acetylenes (Sonogashira coupling), and acrylates (Heck reaction) in the second position.

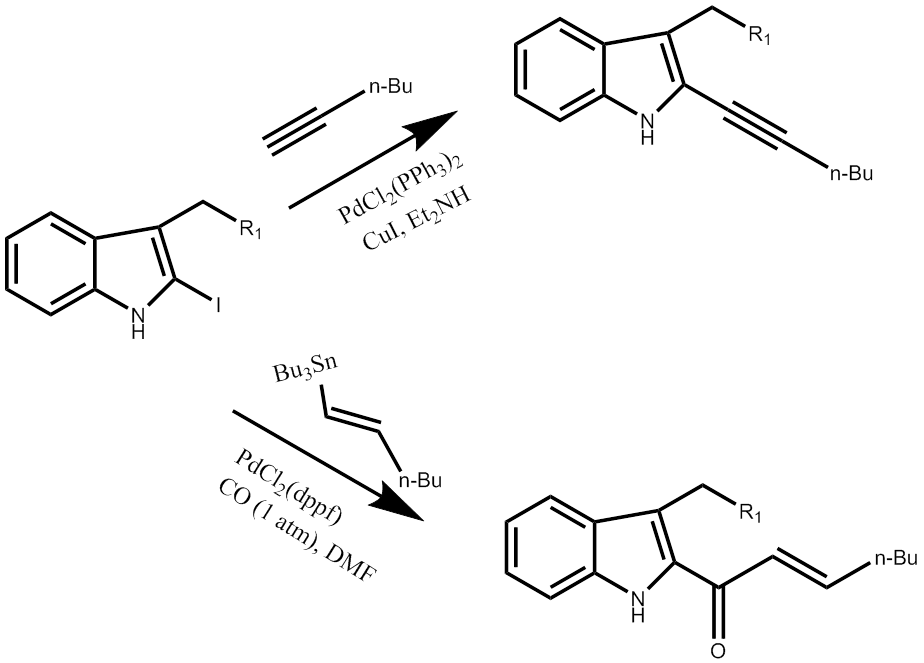
Possible next step synthesis reactions working with the 2-iodoindoles from the Fukuyama Synthesis.

== Applications ==
The synthesis is one of the simplest methods for creating poly-substituted indoles, this procedure has been utilized in numerous natural product syntheses, including aspidophytine, vinblastine, and strychnine

Shown below is the fourth step in the synthesis of (+)-Vinblastine, the application of the Fukuyama Indole synthesis to create a disubstituted indole.

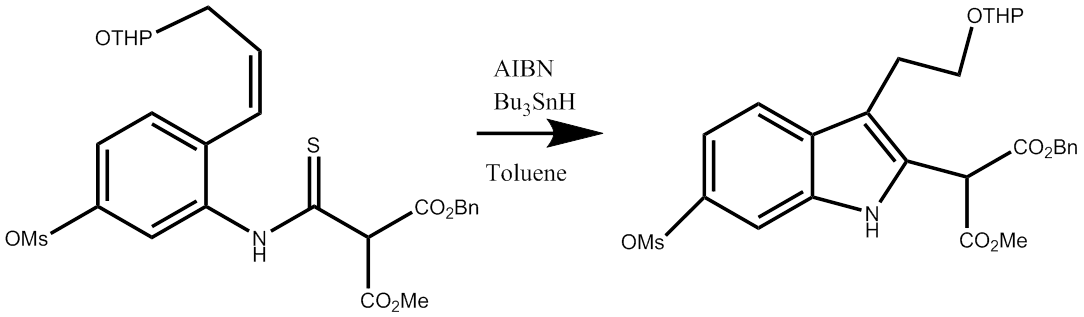
Sample Fukuyama Indole Reaction Step in the Synthesis of Vinblastine

In addition, the fukuyama reaction plays a role in the syntheses of indolocarbazoles, biindolyls, and the total synthesis of vincadifformine and tabersonine.
