= Bischler–Möhlau indole synthesis =

Chemical reaction

Bischler-Möhlau indole synthesis
Named after	August Bischler; Richard Möhlau
Reaction type	Ring forming reaction

Identifiers
RSC ontology ID	RXNO:0000523

The Bischler–Möhlau indole synthesis, also often referred to as the Bischler indole synthesis, is a chemical reaction that forms a 2-aryl-indole from an α-bromo-acetophenone and excess aniline; it is named after August Bischler and Richard Möhlau .

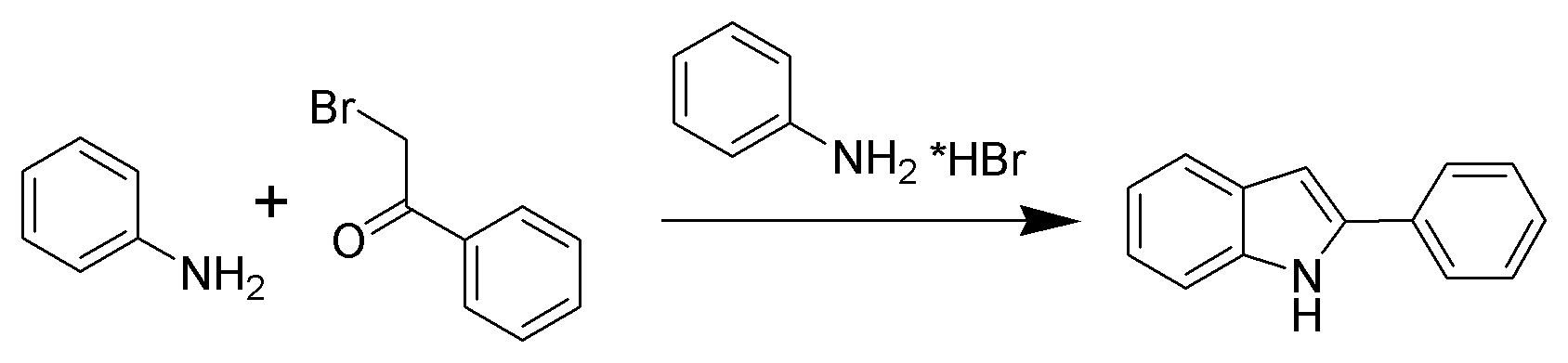
The Bischler-Möhlau indole synthesis

Despite its long history, this classical reaction had received relatively little attention in comparison with other methods for indole synthesis, owing to the reactions harsh conditions, poor yields and unpredictable regioselectivity. Recently, milder methods have been developed, including the use of lithium bromide as a catalyst and an improved procedure involving the use of microwave irradiation.

== History ==
What is now known as the Bischler-Möhlau indole synthesis was discovered and formulated through the separate, but complimentary, findings of German Scientist Richard Möhlau in 1882 and Russia-born German chemist August Bischler (with partner H. Brion) in 1892. These two researchers did not collaborate with each other, but instead independently developed very similar procedures starting from an aromatic ketone structure with an excess of some aniline and ultimately producing a product. The images below depict the original indole synthesis equations written by Möhlau and Bischler, respectively:

$\mathsf{C_6H_5COCH_2Br + NH_3 = C_8H_7N + HBr + H_2O}$
This image depicts August Bischler's original chemical description of this Indole Synthesis as it appeared in "Ueber die Entstehung einiger substituirter Indole" (including the original "=" notation, which at the time functioned as our modern "arrow" would in chemical equations).

This equation depicts Richard Möhlau's original chemical description of this indole synthesis, as it appeared in "Ueber die Einwirkung primärer aromatischer Aminbasen auf Acetophenonbromid"

Indole Synthesis
Bischler	C_{6}H_{5}COCH_{2}Br + NH_{3} = C_{8}H_{7}N +HBr + H_{2}O
Möhlau	C_{6}H_{5}COCH_{2}Cl + NH3 = C_{6}H_{5}CNCH_{2} + HCl + H2O
(equation notation written as seen in the original articles)

Being that both scientists had published their works for indole synthesis within the same decade, the general indole synthesis process was given the name Bischler-Möhlau indole synthesis.

This original procedure for the indole synthesis is known to have inconsistent results and yields, but has been modified into new indole synthesis procedures:

- Buu-Hoï Modified Indole Synthesis
- Blackhall and Thomson Modified Indole Synthesis
- Japp and Murray Modified Indole Synthesis

== Reaction mechanism ==
The first two step involve the reaction of the α-bromo-acetophenone with molecules of aniline to form intermediate 4. The charged aniline forms a decent enough leaving group for an electrophilic cyclization to form intermediate 5, which quickly aromatizes and tautomerizes to give the desired indole 7.

The mechanism of the Bischler-Möhlau indole synthesis

== See also ==
- Fischer indole synthesis
- Bischler–Napieralski reaction
