= Gassman indole synthesis =

The Gassman indole synthesis is a series of chemical reactions used to synthesize substituted indoles by addition of an aniline and a ketone bearing a thioether substituent.

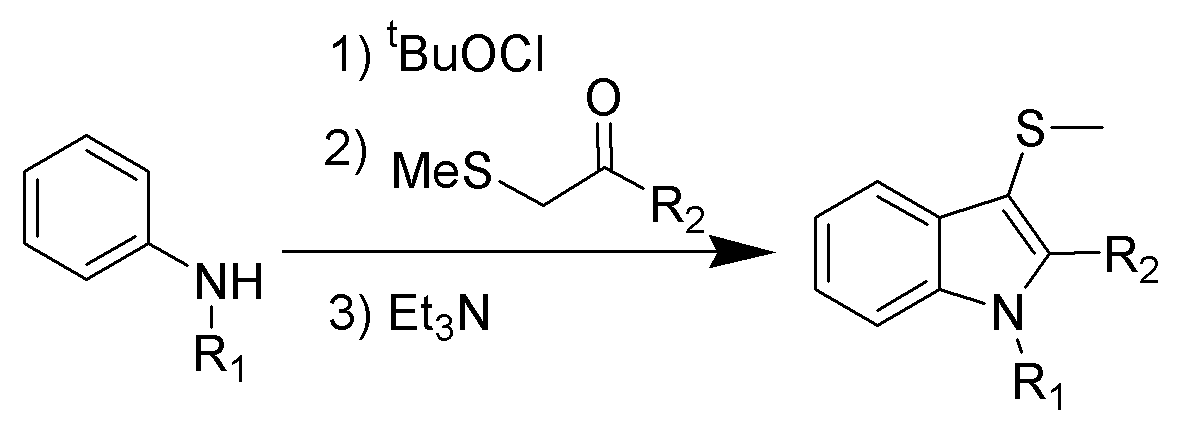
The Gassman indole synthesis

This is a one-pot chemical reaction, and none of the intermediates are isolated. R_{1} can be hydrogen or alkyl, while R_{2} works best with aryl, but can also be alkyl. Electron-rich anilines, such as 4-methoxyaniline, tend to fail in this reaction.

The 3-position thiomethyl group is often removed using Raney nickel to give the 3-H-indole.

== Reaction mechanism ==
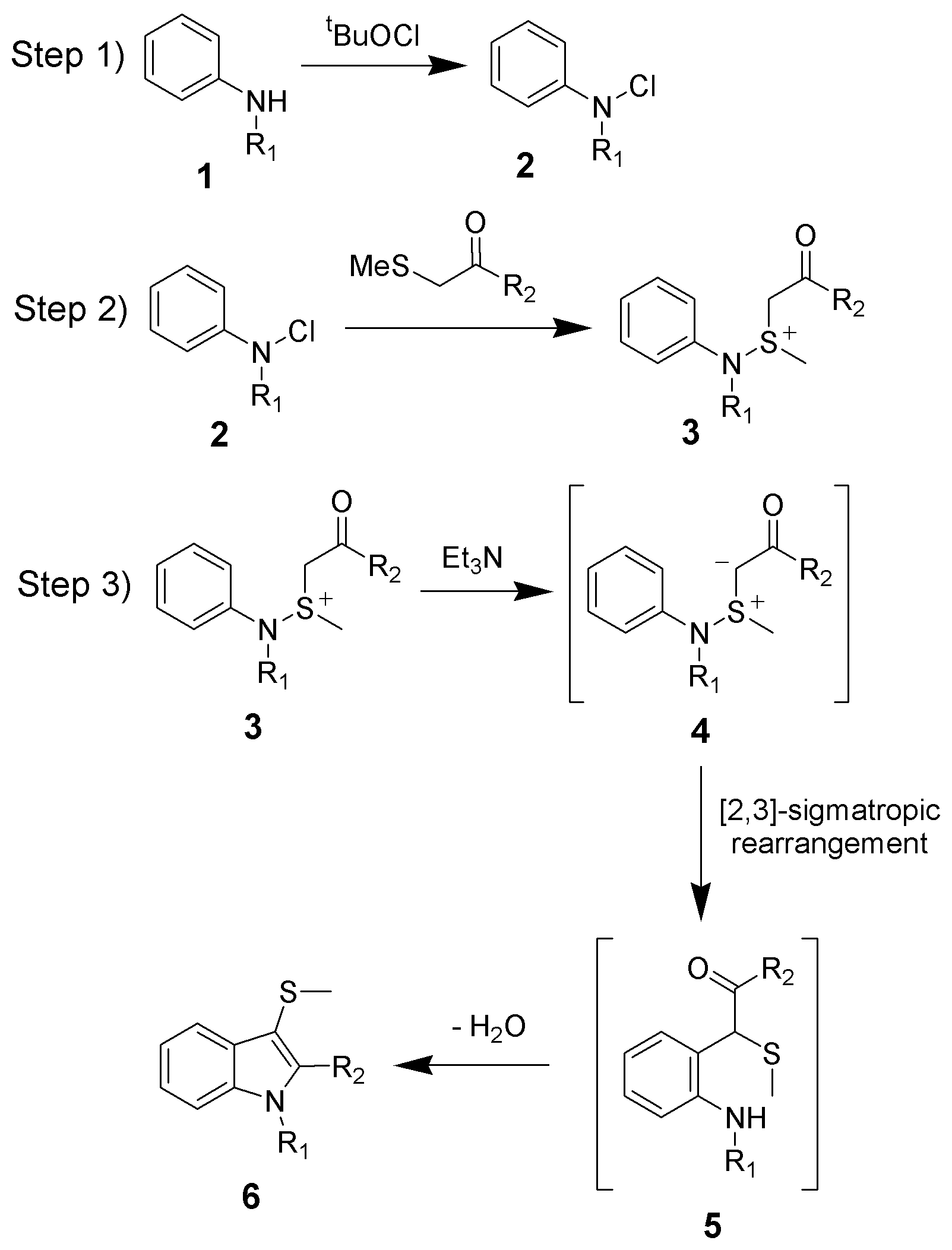
The reaction mechanism of the Gassman indole synthesis

The reaction mechanism of the Gassman indole synthesis is divided among three steps.

The first step is the oxidation of the aniline 1 using tert-butyl hypochlorite (tBuOCl) to give the chloramine 2.

The second step is the addition of the keto-thioether to give the sulfonium ion 3, and is typically done at low temperatures (−78 °C).

The third and final step is the addition of a base, which in this case is triethylamine. Upon warming to room temperature, the base will deprotonate the sulfonium ion creating the sulfonium ylide 4, which quickly undergoes a [2,3]-sigmatropic rearrangement to give the ketone 5. The ketone 5 will undergo a facile condensation to give the desired 3-thiomethylindole 6.
