= Thiele tube =

Laboratory apparatus used to determine melting point

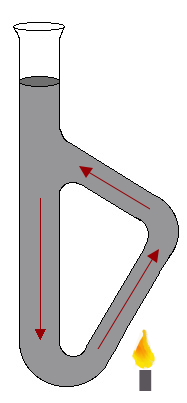
Drawing of a Thiele tube with red arrows showing convection current

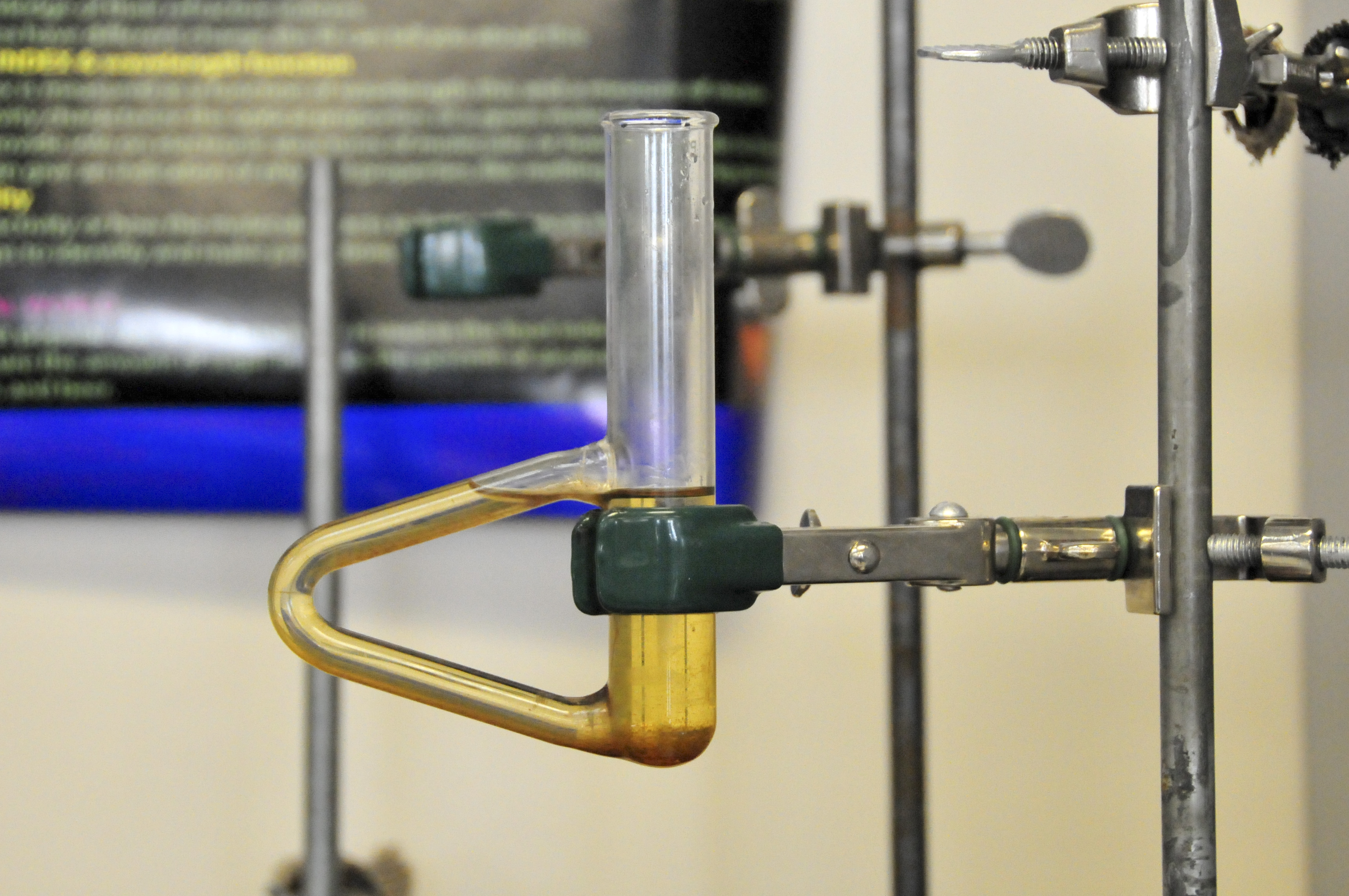
A photograph of a Thiele tube. The oil level is a little low now to compensate for expansion when heating commences.

The Thiele tube, named after the German chemist Johannes Thiele, is a laboratory glassware designed to contain and heat an oil bath. Such a setup is commonly used in the determination of the melting point or boiling point of a substance. The apparatus resembles a glass test tube with an attached handle.

== Operation ==
Oil is poured into the tube, and then the "handle" is heated, either by a small flame or some other heating element. The shape of the Thiele tube allows for formation of convection currents in the oil when it is heated. These currents maintain a fairly uniform temperature distribution throughout the oil in the tube. The side arm of the tube is designed to generate these convection currents and thus transfer the heat from the flame evenly and rapidly throughout the heating oil. The sample, packed in a capillary tube, is attached to the thermometer, and held by means of a rubber band or a small slice of rubber tubing. The Thiele tube is usually heated using a microburner with a small flame.

== Melting point determination ==
A sample in a sealed capillary, attached to a thermometer with a rubber band, is immersed in the tube. Heating is commenced, and the temperature ranges at which the sample melts can then be observed. During heating, the point at which melting is observed and the temperature constant is the melting point of the sample. A more modern method uses dedicated equipment, known as a melting point apparatus. A slow heating rate at the melting point is needed in order to get an accurate measurement. Record the temperature on the thermometer when the sample starts to melt and record the temperature again when all of the sample has melted (this gives you the melting point range, which is what is usually quoted in chemical literature).

== Boiling point determination ==
A Thiele tube can be used to measure the boiling point of a liquid by the Siwoloboff method. A sample in a fusion tube is attached to a thermometer with a rubber band, and immersed in the tube. A sealed capillary, open end pointing down, is placed in the fusion tube. The Thiele tube is heated; dissolved gases evolve from the sample first. Once the sample starts to boil, heating is stopped, and the temperature starts to fall. The temperature at which the liquid sample is sucked into the sealed capillary is the boiling point of the sample.

== In popular culture ==
In an iconic scene from The French Connection (film), a talkative chemist tests the purity of an illicit load of heroin using mineral oil and a Thiele tube to verify the melting point of the drug.
