= Pechmann condensation =

Named reaction for synthesis of coumarins

Named after	Hans von Pechmann
Reaction type	Ring forming reaction

Reaction
Phenol
+
β-keto carboxylic acid or β-keto ester
↓
Coumarin(s)

Conditions
Temperature	Variable
Catalyst	Strong acids: AlCl_{3}, CH_{4}SO_{3}, H_{2}SO_{4}

Identifiers
Organic Chemistry Portal	pechmann-condensation

The Pechmann condensation is a synthesis of coumarins, starting from a phenol and a carboxylic acid or ester containing a β-carbonyl group. The condensation is performed under acidic conditions. The mechanism involves an esterification/transesterification followed by attack of the activated carbonyl ortho to the oxygen to generate the new ring. The final step is a dehydration, as seen following an aldol condensation. It was discovered by the German chemist Hans von Pechmann .

== Mechanism ==
To synthesize coumarin derivatives, β-ketoesters can be condensed with phenols under acidic conditions. In this case, a transesterification reaction occurs first with the formation of the phenol ester. This is then followed by ring closure, similar to Friedel-Crafts alkylation.

== Examples ==
With simple phenols, the conditions are harsh, although yields may still be good.

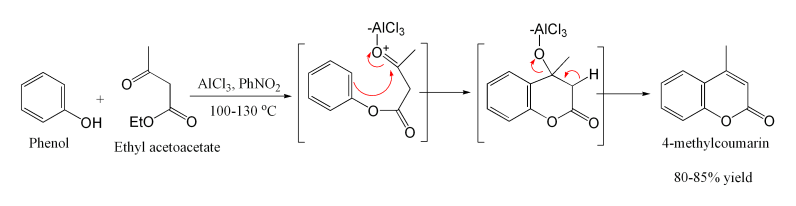

With highly activated phenols such as resorcinol, the reaction can be performed under much milder conditions. This provides a useful route to umbelliferone derivatives:

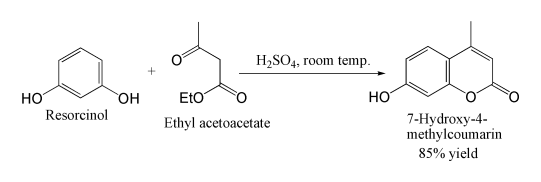
The Pechmann condensation as applied to 7-hydroxy-4-methylcoumarin

For coumarins unsubstituted at the 4-position, the method requires the use of formylacetic acid or ester. These are unstable and not commercially available, but the acid may be produced in situ from malic acid and sulfuric acid above 100 °C. As soon as it forms, the formylacetic acid performs the Pechmann condensation. In the example shown, umbelliferone itself is produced, albeit in low yield:

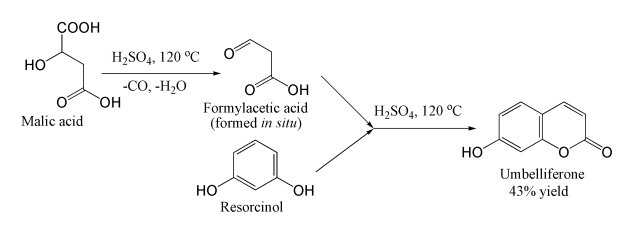
The Pechmann condensation as applied to umbelliferone

== Mechanistic studies ==
The mechanism of the reaction has been studied in details with theoretical treatment.

The study shown that reaction takes place on oxo-form, and not on enolic-form. Three different oxo-routes have been proposed.

== Simonis chromone cyclization ==
In a variation the reaction of phenols and beta-ketoesters and phosphorus pentoxide yields a chromone. This reaction is called Simonis chromone cyclization. The ketone in the ketoester is activated by P_{2}O_{5} for reaction with the phenol hydroxyl group first, the ester group in it is then activated for electrophilic attack of the arene.

== See also ==
- Aldol condensation
- Kostanecki acylation
- Perkin reaction
