= Wohl degradation =

Chemical reaction

The Wohl degradation in carbohydrate chemistry is a chain contraction method for aldoses. The classic example is the conversion of glucose to arabinose as shown below. The reaction is named after the German chemist Alfred Wohl (1863–1939).

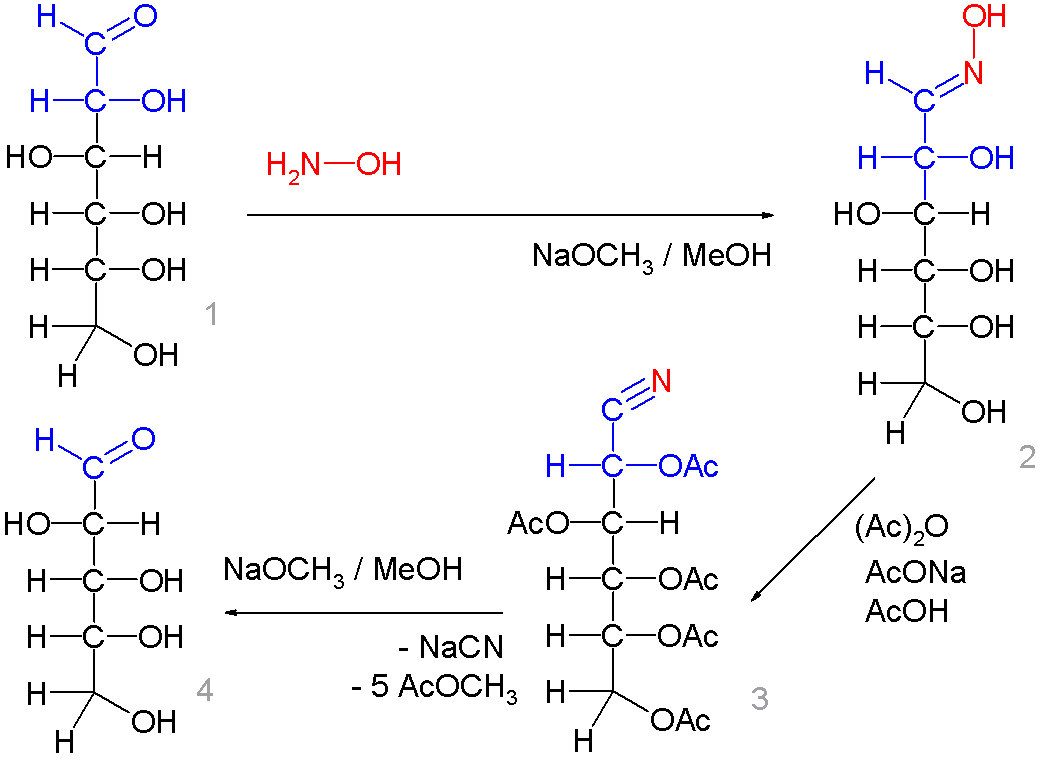
The Wohl degradation

In one modification, d-glucose is converted to the glucose oxime by reaction with hydroxylamine and sodium methoxide. In the second step the pentaacetyl glycononitrile is formed by reaction with acetic anhydride in acetic acid with sodium acetate. In this reaction step the oxime is converted into the nitrile with simultaneous conversion of all the alcohol groups to acetate groups.

In the final step, sodium methoxide removes the acetate groups and ejects cyanide, which produces the aldehyde.

== Ruff–Fenton degradation ==
In a variation, the Ruff–Fenton degradation (Otto Ruff 1898, H.J.H. Fenton 1893) converts the aldose first to the alpha-hydroxy-carboxylic acid with bromine and calcium hydroxide and then to the shortened aldose by reaction with Iron(III) sulfate and hydrogen peroxide.

== See also ==
- Nef reaction
