= Fukuyama reduction =

Chemical reaction

Named after	Tohru Fukuyama
Reaction type	Organic redox reaction

Identifiers
Organic Chemistry Portal	fukuyama-reduction
RSC ontology ID	RXNO:0000680

The Fukuyama reduction is an organic reaction and an organic reduction in which a thioester is reduced to an aldehyde by a silyl hydride in presence of a catalytic amount of palladium. This reaction was invented in 1990 by Tohru Fukuyama. In the original scope of the reaction the silyl hydride was triethylsilane and the catalyst palladium on carbon:

Fukuyama reductions are used for the conversion of carboxylic acids (as thioester precursor) to aldehydes which is considered a difficult procedure because of the ease of secondary reduction to an alcohol.

== Reaction mechanism ==
The basic reaction mechanism for this reaction takes place as a catalytic cycle:

- Oxidative addition:
  $$\ce{{R-C(O)-SR} + Pd^0 -> RC(O)-Pd^{II}-SR}$$
- Transmetallation:
  $$\ce{{RC(O)-Pd^{II}-SR} + R3SiH -> {RC(O)-Pd^{II}-H} + R3Si-SR}$$
- Reductive elimination:
  $$\ce{RC(O)-Pd^{II}-H -> {RC(O)-H} + Pd^0}$$

== Scope ==
In a variation of the Fukuyama reduction the core BODIPY molecule has been synthesized from the SMe-substituted derivative: Additional reagents are copper(I)-thiophene-2-carboxylate (CuTC), Pd(dba)2 and tri(2-furyl)phosphine

In the related Fukuyama coupling the hydride is replaced by a carbon nucleophile.
