= Dimroth rearrangement =

Chemical reaction

The Dimroth rearrangement is a rearrangement reaction taking place with certain 1,2,3-triazoles where endocyclic and exocyclic nitrogen atoms switch place. This organic reaction was discovered in 1909 by Otto Dimroth.

With R a phenyl group the reaction takes place in boiling pyridine for 24 hours.

This type of triazole has an amino group in the 5 position. After ring-opening to a diazo intermediate, C-C bond rotation is possible with 1,3-migration of a proton.

Certain 1-alkyl-2-iminopyrimidines also display this type of rearrangement.

In the first step is an addition reaction of water followed by ring-opening of the hemiaminal to the aminoaldehyde followed by ring closure.

A known drug example of the Dimroth rearrangement includes in the synthesis of Bemitradine [88133-11-3].
