= Johannes Thiele (chemist) =

German chemist (1865–1918)

Friedrich Karl Johannes Thiele
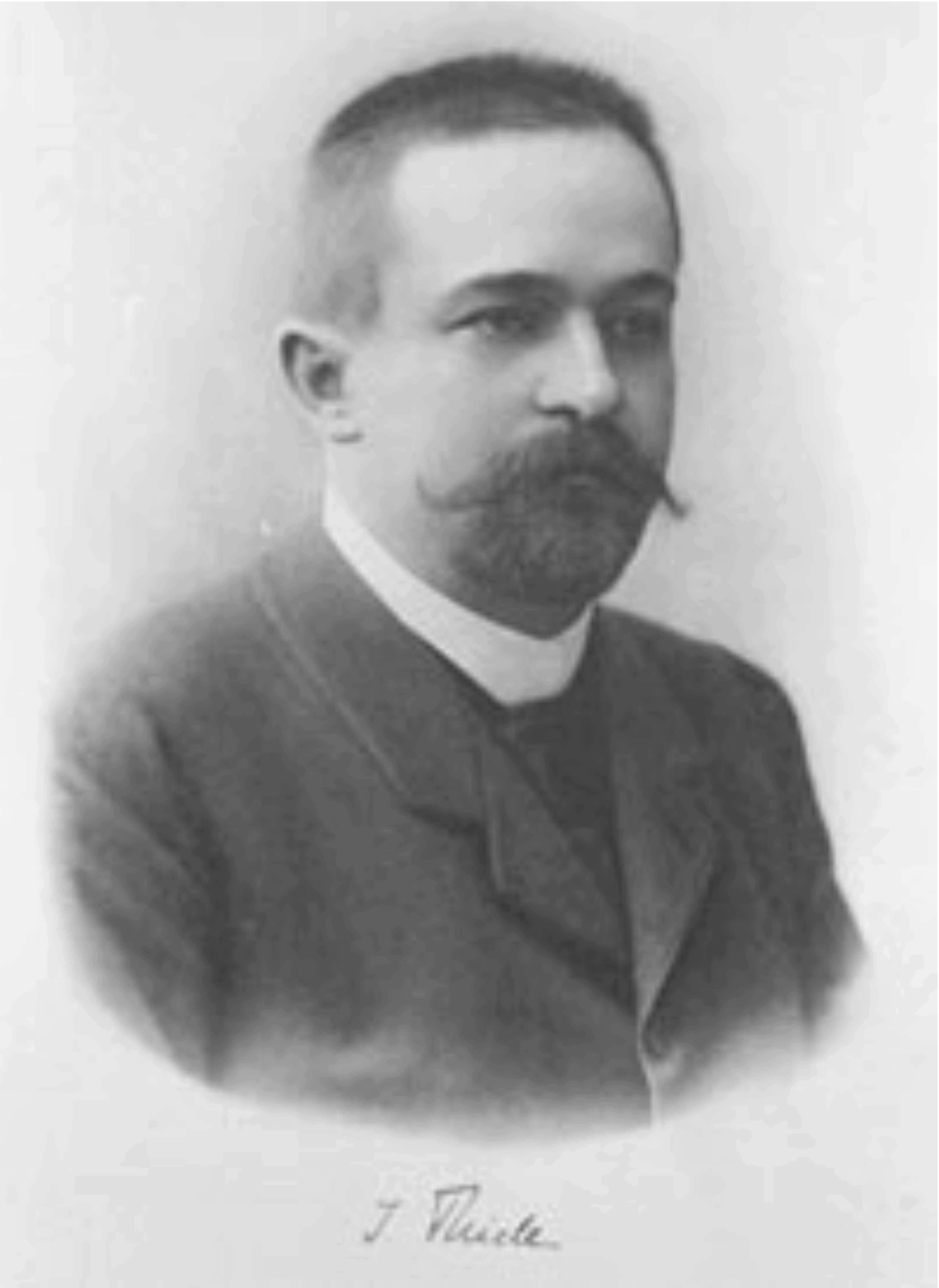
- Born: May 13, 1865; Ratibor, Prussia, now Racibórz, Poland
- Died: April 17, 1918 (aged 52); Straßburg, German Empire, now Strasbourg, France
- Education: University of Halle
- Known for: Thiele tube
- Scientific career
- Fields: Chemistry
- Workplaces: Ludwig-Maximilians-Universität München, University of Strasbourg
- Doctoral advisor: Jacob Volhard
- Doctoral students: Heinrich Otto Wieland, Jakob Meisenheimer, Hermann Staudinger, Otto Dimroth, Sir Robert H. Pickard

Friedrich Karl Johannes Thiele (May 13, 1865 – April 17, 1918) was a German chemist and a prominent professor at several universities, including the Ludwig-Maximilians-Universität München and the University of Strasbourg. He developed many laboratory techniques related to isolation of organic compounds. In 1907, he described a device for the accurate determination of melting points, since named Thiele tube after him.

== Biography ==
Thiele was born in Ratibor, Prussia, now Racibórz, Poland. Thiele studied mathematics at the University of Breslau, but later turned to chemistry, receiving his doctorate from the University of Halle in 1890. He taught at the Ludwig-Maximilians-Universität München from 1893 to 1902, when he was appointed professor of chemistry at the University of Strasbourg.

He developed the preparation of glyoxal bis(guanylhydrazone).

After Kekulé's proposal for benzene structure in 1865, Thiele suggested a "Partial Valence Hypothesis", which concerned double and triple carbon-carbon bonds with which he explains their particular reactivity. In 1899 this led to the prediction of the resonance that existed in benzene, and he proposed a resonance structure, by using a broken circle to represent the partial bonds. Later this problem was completely solved with the advent of quantum theory.

In 1899, Thiele was head of Organic Chemistry at the Bavarian Academy of Sciences in Munich. With his associate Otto Holzinger, he synthesised an iminodibenzyl nucleus: two benzene rings attached together by a nitrogen atom and an ethylene bridge.

He discovered the condensation of ketones and aldehydes with cyclopentadiene as a route to fulvenes. He also recognized that these deeply colored species were related to but isomeric with benzene derivatives. In 1901 he discovered potassium cyclopentadienyl, but there was little interest in this topic before the discovery of ferrocene in 1951.

According to one of his students Heinrich Otto Wieland, Thiele had a dislike of the chemistry of natural products.
