= Fukuyama coupling =

Chemical reaction

Named after	Tohru Fukuyama
Reaction type	Coupling reaction

Identifiers
Organic Chemistry Portal	fukuyama-coupling

The Fukuyama coupling is a coupling reaction taking place between a thioester and an organozinc halide in the presence of a palladium catalyst. The reaction product is a ketone. This reaction was discovered by Tohru Fukuyama et al. in 1998.

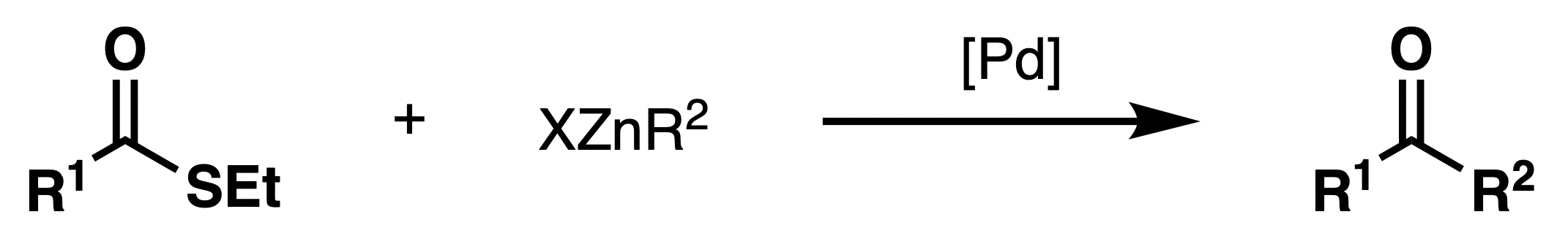

== Advantages ==
The reaction has gained considerable importance in synthetic organic chemistry due to its high chemoselectivity, mild reaction conditions, and the use of less-toxic reagents. In particular, the protocol is compatible with sensitive functional groups such as ketones, α-acetates, sulfides, aryl bromides, chlorides, and aldehydes. This excellent chemoselectivity is attributed to the fast rate of ketone formation compared to oxidative addition of palladium to aryl bromides or the nucleophilic addition of zinc reagents to aldehydes.

== Mechanism ==
Although the Fukuyama cross-coupling reaction has been widely used in natural product synthesis, the reaction mechanism remains unclear. Various catalysts have been shown to promote reactivity, including Pd/C, Pd(OH)_{2}/C, Pd(OAc)_{2}, PdCl_{2}, NiCl_{2}, Ni(acac)_{2}, etc. The proposed catalytic cycle using Pd(OH)_{2}/C (Pearlman’s catalyst) features the in situ generation of active Pd/C by reduction with a zinc reagent or zinc dust. The active Pd/C species then undergoes oxidative addition with a thioester, followed by transmetallation with a zinc reagent and reductive elimination, to afford the ketone coupling product.

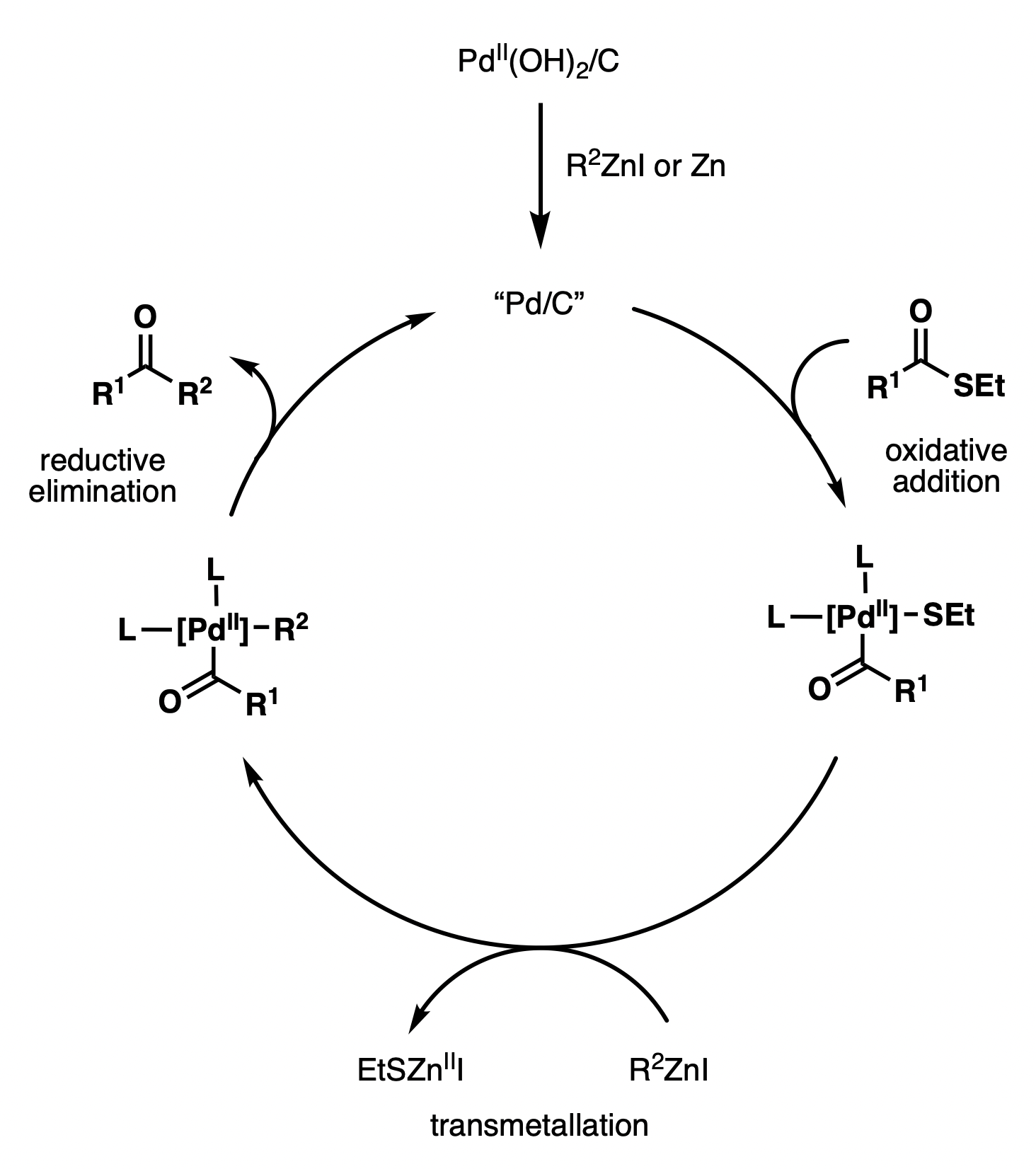

== Reaction Conditions ==
=== Pd-catalyzed Fukuyama Coupling ===
Fukuyama et al. reported the PdCl_{2}(PPh_{3})_{2}-catalyzed coupling of ethyl thioesters with organozinc reagents in 1998. Remarkably, α−amino ketones starting from thioester derivatives of N-protected amino acids can be synthesized without racemization in good to excellent yields (58-88%).

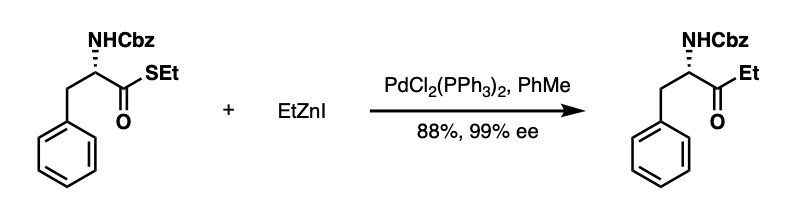

=== Ni-catalyzed Fukuyama Coupling ===
Aside from the use of palladium catalysts, the first nickel-catalyzed Fukuyama coupling was reported by Shimizu and Seki in 2002. Ni(acac)_{2} was found to produce superior yields compared to other nickel catalysts.

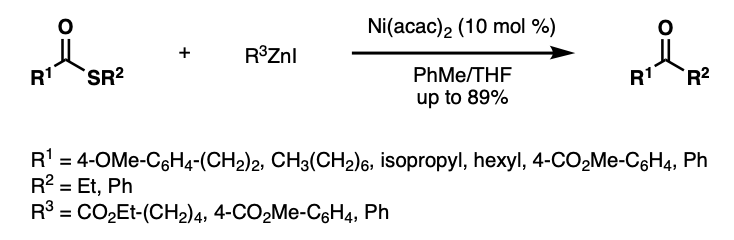

=== Pd/C-catalyzed Fukuyama Coupling Employing Dialkylzinc Reagents ===
In 2004, the same group of researchers reported the Pd/C-catalyzed Fukuyama ketone synthesis. This reaction couples dialkylzinc reagents with various thioesters in the presence of zinc bromide, which is in situ generated from bromine and zinc dust. The authors proposed that the inactive zinc bromide is shifted to the active RZnBr species via the Schlenk equilibrium. Additionally, DMF can be used as an additive to increase reaction yields.

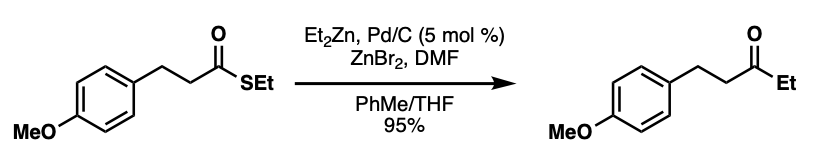

== Applications in Natural Product Total Synthesis ==
=== Biotin ===
The reaction has been used to shorten the synthesis of (+)-biotin. Previously, a lengthy sequence of six steps was required to install the C2 side chain of (+)-biotin to the thiolactone intermediate 1. Shimizu and Seki realized the efficient synthesis of (+)-biotin via the Fukuyama coupling of the thiolactone 1 and an easily prepared alkyl zinc reagent 2 in the presence of catalytic PdCl_{2}(PPh_{3})_{2}. The reaction generated an alcohol 3 which was directly reacted without purification with PTSA to afford alkene 4 in 86% yield as a single isomer. Hydrogenation and a subsequent benzyl-deprotection of the alkene intermediate according to the reported procedure afforded (+)-biotin in 73% yield over two steps. This Fukuyama coupling sequence provided (+)-biotin in 63% overall yield in three steps from the thiolactone 1, thus allowing practical access to the vitamin due the short sequence, high yield, mild conditions, and ready availability of the reagents.

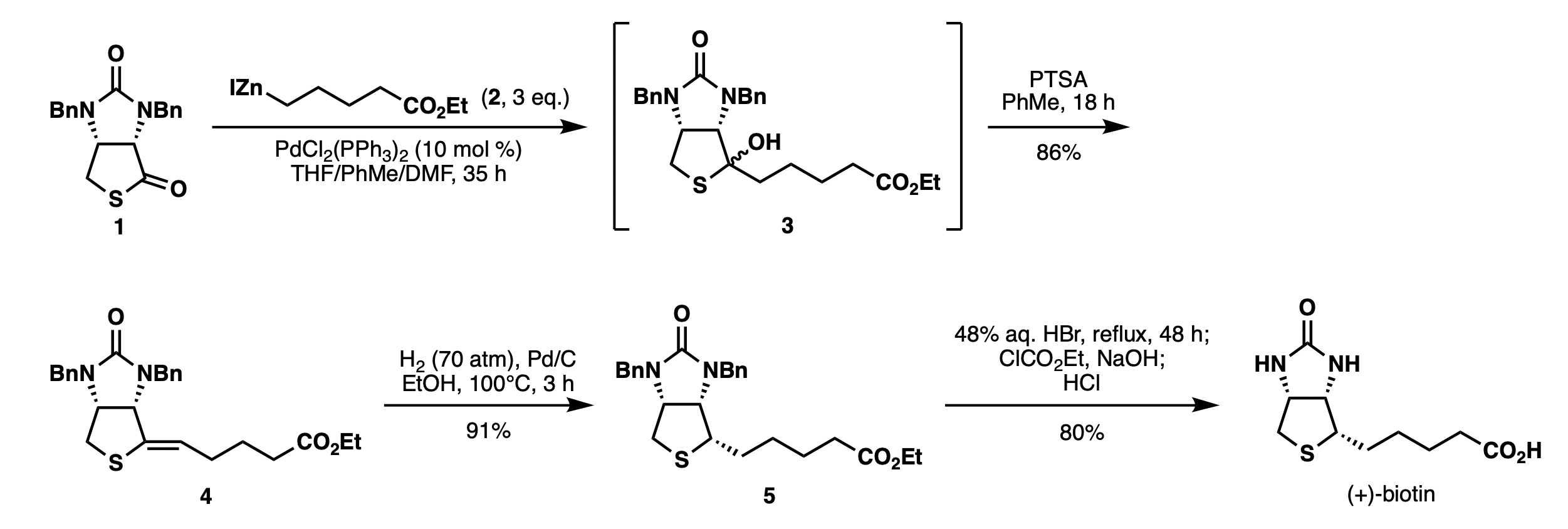

== Related Reactions ==
Retrosynthetically, the reaction resembles a Barbier addition. Mechanistically, the reaction is conceptually related to Fukuyama Reduction and the Fukuyama-Mitsunobu reaction.
