= Larock indole synthesis =

Heteroannulation reaction

| Named after | Richard C. Larock |
| Reaction type | Ring forming reaction |

Identifiers
| RSC ontology ID | RXNO:0000396 |

The Larock indole synthesis is a heteroannulation reaction that uses palladium as a catalyst to synthesize indoles from an ortho-iodoaniline and a disubstituted alkyne. It is also known as Larock heteroannulation. The reaction is extremely versatile and can be used to produce varying types of indoles. Larock indole synthesis was first proposed by Richard C. Larock in 1991 at Iowa State University.

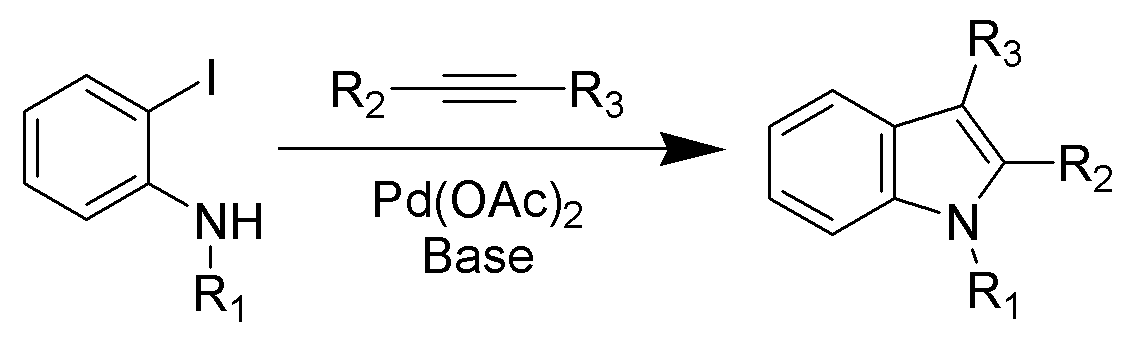
The Larock indole synthesis

== Overall reaction ==
The reaction usually occurs with an o-iodianiline or its derivatives, 2–5 equivalents of an alkyne, palladium(II) (PdII), an excess of sodium or potassium carbonate base, PPh_{3}, and 1 equivalent of LiCl or n-Bu_{4}NCl. N-methyl, N-acetyl, and N-tosyl derivatives of ortho-iodoanilines have been shown to be the most successful anilines that can be used to produce good to excellent yields.

== Reagents and optimal conditions ==
=== Chlorides ===
Either LiCl or n-Bu_{4}N are used depending on the reaction conditions, but LiCl appears to be the more effective base in Larock indole annulation. The stoichiometry of LiCl is also considerably important, as more than 1 equivalent of LiCl will slow the rate of reaction and lower the overall yield.

=== Bases ===
Bases other than sodium or potassium carbonate have been used to produce a good overall yield of the annulation reaction. For example, KOAc can be used with 1 equivalent of LiCl. However, the reaction using KOAc must be used at 120 °C to reach completion of the reaction at a reasonable time. In contrast K_{2}CO_{3} can be used at 100 °C.

=== Alkynes ===
The Larock indole synthesis is a flexible reaction partly due to the variety of substituted alkynes that can be used in the annulation reaction. In particular, alkynes with substituents including alkyls, aryls, alkenyls, hydroxyls, and silyls have been successfully used. However, bulkier tertiary alkyl or trimethylsilyl groups have been shown to provide a higher yield. The annulation reaction will also proceed more efficiently when 2–5 equivalents of an alkyne is used. Less than two equivalents appear to create suboptimal conditions for the reaction.

=== PPh_{3} as a catalyst ===
5% mol of PPh_{3} was initially used in the reaction as a catalyst. However, later experiments have shown that PPh_{3} does not significantly improve the overall yield and is not necessary.

== Reaction mechanism ==
The Larock indole synthesis proceeds via the following intermediate steps:

1. Pd(OAc)2 is reduced to Pd(0).
2. A coordination of the chloride occurs to form a chloride-ligated zerovalent palladium.
3. The o-iodoaniline undergoes oxidative addition to Pd(II).
4. The alkyne coordinates to the Pd(II) by ligand exchange.
5. A migratory insertion causes the alkyne to undergo regioselective syn-insertion into the arylpalladium bond. Regioselectivity is determined during this step.
6. The nitrogen displaces the halide in the resulting vinylic palladium intermediate to form the six-membered palladium-containing heterometallacycle.
7. The Pd(II) center undergoes a reductive elimination to form the indole and regenerate Pd(0) which can then be recycled into the catalytic indole process.

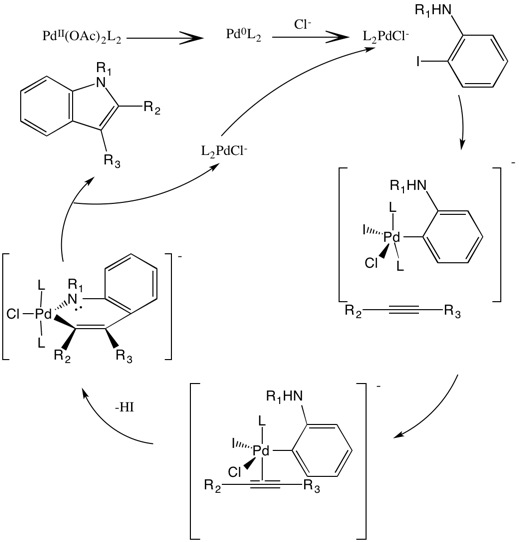
Larock indole synthesis mechanism.

The carbopalladation step is regioselective when unsymmetrical alkynes are used. Although it was previously believed that the alkyne is inserted with the less sterically-hindering R-group adjacent to the arylpalladium, Larock et al. observed that the larger more sterically-hindering R-group is inserted next to the arylpalladium. They suggest that the driving force of the alkyne insertion may be the steric hindrance present in the developing carbon-carbon bond and the orientation of the alkyne prior to syn-insertion of the alkyne into the aryl palladium bond. Alkyne insertion occurs so that the large substituent on the alkyne avoids steric strain from the short developing carbon-carbon bond by interacting with the longer carbon-palladium bond.

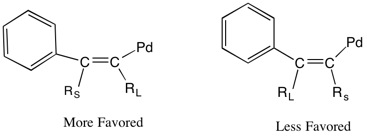
Regioselectivity of the alkyne insertion in Larock indole synthesis

== Modifications and variations ==
o-bromoanilines or o-chloroanilines do not undergo Larock indole synthesis. However, researchers from Boehringer-Ingelheim were able to successfully use both o-bromoanilines and o-chloroanilines to form indoles by using N-methyl-2-pyrrolidone (NMP) as the solvent with 1,1'bis(di-tert-butylphosphino)ferrocene as the palladium ligand. O-bromoanilines and o-chloroanilines are more readily available and cost-effective over using o-iodianiline in Larock indole synthesis.

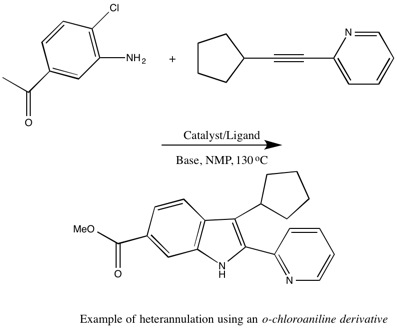
Heterannulation of an indole using o-chloroaniline

Monguchi et al. also derived 2- and 2,3-substituted indoles without using LiCl. The optimized Indole reaction uses 10% Pd/C (3.0 mol%) with 1.1 equivalent of NaOAc, and NMP at 110–130 °C. Monguchi et al. state that their optimized condition of the Larock indole synthesis without LiCl is a more mild, environmentally benign, and efficient strategy for producing indoles.

== Applications ==
Indoles are one of the most prevalent heterocyclic structures found in biological processes, so the production of indole derivatives are important in a diversity of fields.

Nishikawa et al. derived iso-tryptophan by using Larock indole synthesis with pre-synthesized α-C-glucosylpropargyl glycine and o-iodo-tosylanilide. This reaction produced the product which had the reverse regioselectivity of normal Larock indole synthesis. The larger substituent was placed adjacent to the forming carbon-carbon bond, rather than the carbon-palladium bond. The explanation for the reverse regioselectivity which produced the iso-tryptophan is unknown.

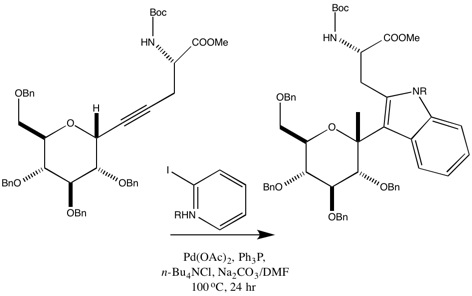
Larock indole synthesis of iso-tryptophan using α-C-glycosylamino acid

Optically active tryptophan which adheres to the regioselectivity of the Larock indole synthesis can also be synthesized using o-iodoaniline with propargyl substituted bislactim ethyl ether. Propargyl substituted bislactim ethyl ether is generated by using Schöllkopf chiral auxiliary bis lactam ether with n-BuLi, THF, and 3-halo-1-9trimethylsily1)-1-propyne and extracting the trans-isomer of the propargyl-substituted bislactim.

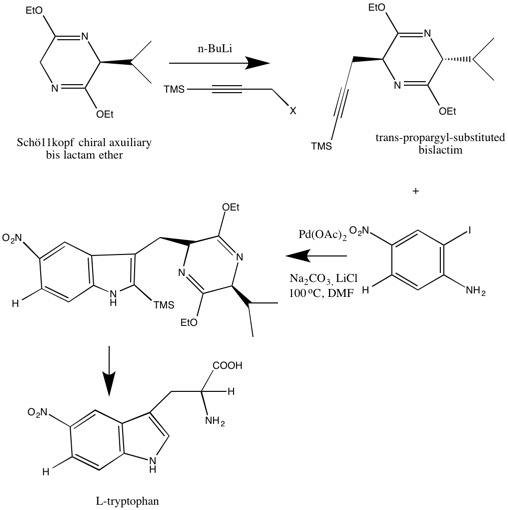
Chirally active tryptophan by Larock indole synthesis

Other relevant applications include the synthesis of 5-HT_{1D} receptor agonist MK-0462, an anti-migraine drug.
