= 1,2-Wittig rearrangement =

Categorization of chemical reactions

A 1,2-Wittig rearrangement is a categorization of chemical reactions in organic chemistry, and consists of a 1,2-rearrangement of an ether with an alkyllithium compound. The reaction is named for Nobel Prize winning chemist Georg Wittig.

The intermediate is an alkoxy lithium salt, and the final product an alcohol. When R" is a good leaving group and electron withdrawing group such as a cyanide (CN) group, this group is eliminated and the corresponding ketone is formed.

== Reaction mechanism ==
The reaction mechanism centers on the formation of a free radical pair with lithium migrating from the carbon atom to the oxygen atom. The R radical then recombines with the ketyl.

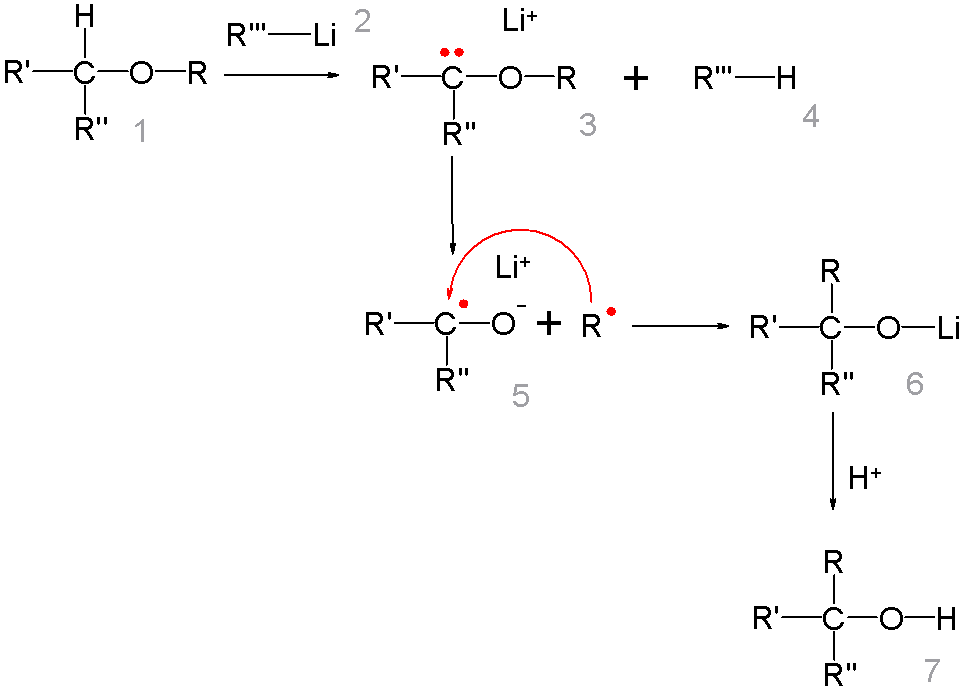
The 1,2-Wittig rearrangement reaction mechanism

The alkyl group migrates in the order of thermodynamical stability methyl < primary alkyl < secondary alkyl < tertiary alkyl, this is in line with the radical mechanism. The radical-ketyl pair is short lived and due to a solvent cage effect some isomerizations take place with retention of configuration.

With certain allyl aryl ethers a competing reaction takes place. The reaction of allyl phenyl ether 1 with sec-butyllithium at −78 °C gives the lithiated intermediate 2 which on heating to −25 °C only shows the rearranged product 5 but not 4 after trapping the lithium alkoxide with trimethylsilyl chloride. This result rules out a radical-ketyl intermediate 3a in favor of the Meisenheimer complex 3b. Additional evidence for this mechanism is provided by the finding that with a para tert-butyl substituent the reaction is retarded.

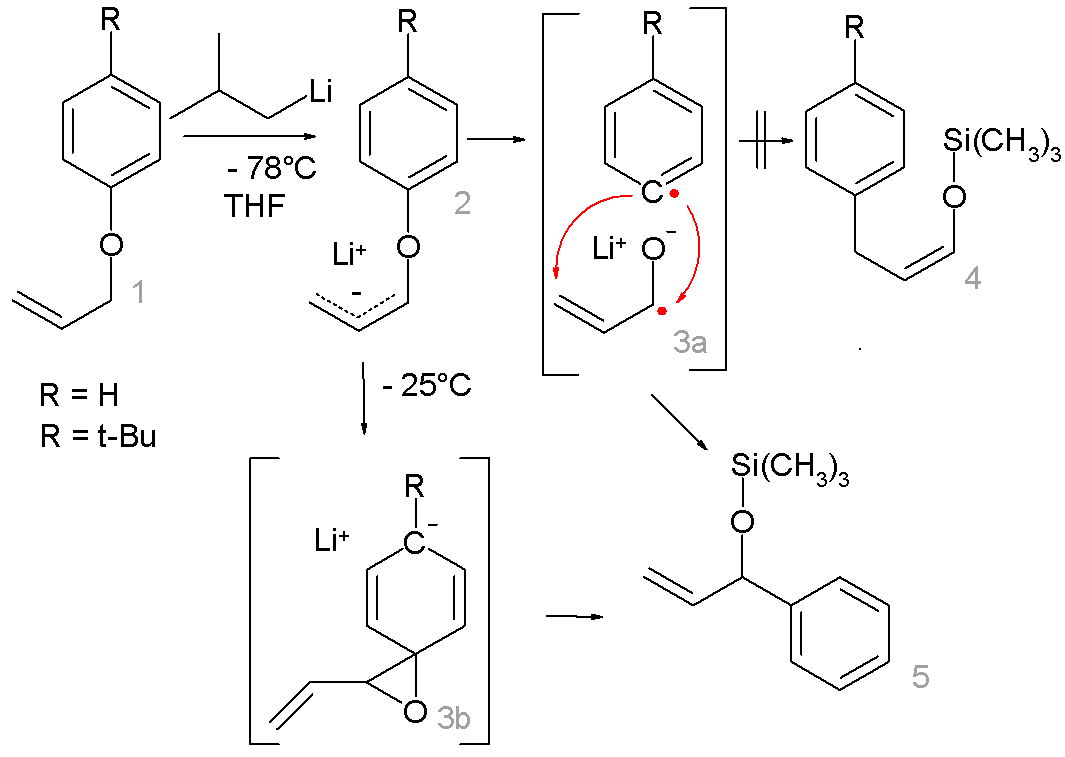
1,2-Wittig rearrangement competing mechanism

The reaction is a formal dyotropic reaction.

== See also ==
- The 2,3-Wittig rearrangement
- The Smiles rearrangement
