= Bischler–Napieralski reaction =

Type of organic reaction

Bischler-Napieralski reaction
Named after	August Bischler; Bernard Napieralski
Reaction type	Ring forming reaction

Identifiers
Organic Chemistry Portal	bischler-napieralski-reaction
RSC ontology ID	RXNO:0000053

The Bischler–Napieralski reaction is an intramolecular electrophilic aromatic substitution reaction that allows for the cyclization of β-arylethylamides or β-arylethylcarbamates. It was first discovered in 1893 by August Bischler and Bernard Napieralski, in affiliation with Basel Chemical Works and the University of Zurich. The reaction is most notably used in the synthesis of dihydroisoquinolines, which can be subsequently oxidized to isoquinolines.

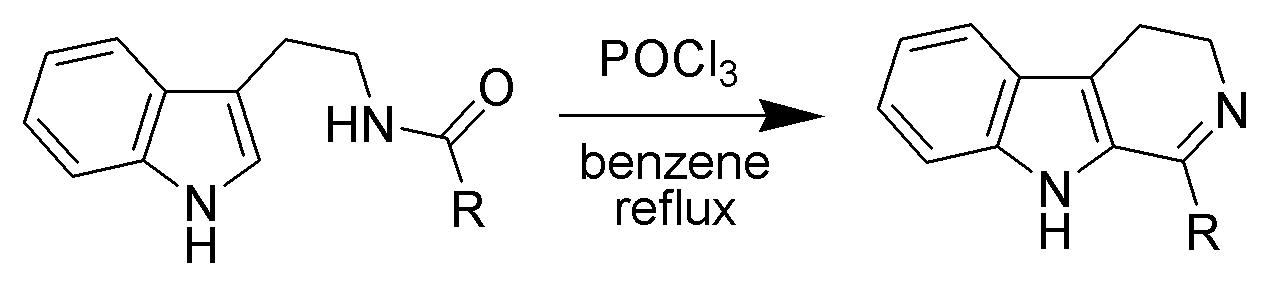
A general scheme of the Bischler–Napieralski reaction.

== Mechanisms ==
Two types of mechanisms have appeared in the literature for the Bischler–Napieralski reaction. Mechanism I involves a dichlorophosphoryl imine-ester intermediate, while Mechanism II involves a nitrilium ion intermediate (both shown in brackets). This mechanistic variance stems from the ambiguity over the timing for the elimination of the carbonyl oxygen in the starting amide.

A mechanism for the Bischler–Napieralski reaction involving an imine-ester intermediate.

In Mechanism I, the elimination occurs with imine formation after cyclization; while in Mechanism II, the elimination yields the nitrilium intermediate prior to cyclization. Currently, it is believed that reaction conditions affect the prevalence of one mechanism over the other (see reaction conditions).

A mechanism for the Bischler–Napieralski reaction involving a nitrilium intermediate.

In certain literature, Mechanism II is augmented with the formation of an imidoyl chloride intermediate produced by the substitution of chloride for the Lewis acid group just prior to the nitrilium ion. Because the dihydroisoquinoline nitrogen is basic, neutralization is necessary to obtain the deprotonated product.

== General reaction reagents and conditions ==
The Bischler–Napieralski reaction is carried out in refluxing acidic conditions and requires a dehydrating agent. Phosphoryl chloride (POCl_{3}) is widely used and cited for this purpose. Additionally, SnCl_{4} and BF_{3} etherate have been used with phenethylamides, while Tf_{2}O and polyphosphoric acid (PPA) have been used with phenethylcarbamates. For reactants lacking electron-donating groups on the benzene ring, phosphorus pentoxide (P_{2}O_{5}) in refluxing POCl_{3} is most effective. Depending on the dehydrating reagent used, the reaction temperature varies from room temperature to 100 °C.

== Related reactions ==
Several reactions that are related to the Bischler–Napieralski reaction are known. In the Morgan–Walls reaction, the linker between the aromatic ring and the amide nitrogen is an ortho-substituted aromatic ring. This N-acyl 2-aminobiphenyl cyclizes to form a phenanthridine. The Pictet–Spengler reaction proceeds from a β-arylamine via condensation with an aldehyde. These two components form an imine, which then cyclizes to form a tetrahydroisoquinoline.

=== Pictet–Gams reaction ===
The Pictet–Gams reaction proceeds from an β-hydroxy-β-phenethylamide. It involves an additional dehydration under the same conditions as the cyclization, giving an isoquinoline. As with the Bischler–Napieralski reaction, the Pictet–Gams reaction requires a strongly dehydrating Lewis acid, such as phosphoryl chloride or phosphorus pentoxide.

== Structural effects and alternate products ==
There are documented variations on the Bischler–Napieralski reaction whose products differ in virtue of either the structure of the initial reactant, the tailoring of reaction conditions, or both. For example, research done by Doi and colleagues suggests that the presence or absence of electron-donating groups on the aryl portion of β-arylethylamides and the ratio of dehydrating reagents influence the patterns of ring closure via electrophilic aromatic substitution, leading to two possible products (see below). Other research on the variations on the Bischler-Napieralski Reaction have investigated the effects of nitro and acetal aryl groups on product formation (see references).

An example of mechanistic and product variation in the Bischler-Napieralski reaction. Treatment of N-[2-(4-methoxyphenyl)-ethyl]-4–methoxybenzamide with POCl_{3} results in the formation of the normal product, 7-methoxy-1-(4-methoxyphenyl)-3,4-dihydroisoquinoline. Treatment exclusively with P_{2}O_{5} results in a mixture of the normal product and an unexpected product, 6-methoxy-1-(4-methoxyphenyl)-3,4-dihydroisoquinoline. The formation of the abnormal product is attributed to the cyclization via the ipso carbon on the phenyl ring to yield a spiro intermediate.

== See also ==
- Pomeranz–Fritsch reaction
