= Kazuhiko Takai =

Professor

- Born: December 18, 1954 (age 71); Tokyo, Japan
- Education: Kyoto University
- Known for: Takai–Utimoto olefination Nozaki–Hiyama–Takai–Kishi reaction
- Awards: Chemical Society of Japan Progress Award (1989) The Society of Synthetic Organic Chemistry of Japan Award (2008) Chemical Society of Japan Award (2013) The Society of Synthetic Organic Chemistry of Japan Award (2019)
- Scientific career
- Fields: Organic Chemistry Organometallic Chemistry
- Thesis: Research on synthetic reactions using amphoteric reactors with aluminum as the key atom (1983)
- Doctoral advisor: Hitosi Nozaki
- Website: https://web.archive.org/web/20240619001159/http://achem.okayama-u.ac.jp/omc/

Kazuhiko Takai (born December 18, 1954) is a professor emeritus of applied chemistry at Okayama University and is the recipient of the 2013 Chemical Society of Japan Award for his work on the use of catalytic metals in synthesis reactions. He studied at Kyoto University with Hitosi Nozaki and at the University of California, Berkeley with Clayton Heathcock. While he is best known for the eponymous Takai olefination, his career has covered a wide variety of topics, including geminal organometallics, organotantalum chemistry, reactions of platinum-group catalysts, and the applications of group 7 metals in organic synthesis.

== Career ==
Takai attended Kyoto University, receiving his Bachelor of Engineering degree in 1977 and Master of Engineering degree in 1979 before pursuing a doctoral degree. Working under Hitosi Nozaki, Takai developed a method for the methylenation of enolizable ketones and aldehydes using geminal dizinc species.

Olefination of ketones and aldehydes via geminal dizinc reagents.

After focusing on the role of organoaluminium compounds in cross-couplings, sigmatropic rearrangements, and ketone synthesis, Takai left the doctoral program in 1981 and accepted an assistant professor position in Nozaki's lab. Following completion of his thesis in 1983, Takai joined Clayton Heathcock's lab at the University of California, Berkeley, where he focused on the diastereoselective synthesis of pentane-1,2,3,4-tetraols.

Takai would return to Kyoto and continue working as an assistant professor with Nozaki until his retirement in 1985, where he continued as an assistant professor under Kiichiro Utimoto until 1994. Takai moved to Okayama University to accept an associate professor position, gaining full professorship in 1998. Professor Takai continued his research at Okayama until his retirement in 2022.

== Major contributions ==
=== The Nozaki–Hiyama–Takai–Kishi Reaction ===
General mechanism for the NHTK coupling between a vinyl halide and an aldehyde.

While working as an assistant professor for Nozaki, Takai published several reports describing reactions between unsaturated organohalides and aldehydes in the presence of chromium(II) chloride. While the seminal report boasted mild reaction conditions and broad functional group tolerance, reproducibility issues hampered wide-scale application. The culprit behind the reproducibility issues was outlined in simultaneous publications from Takai and Yoshito Kishi, where they highlighted the importance of catalytic nickel for successful couplings. Several batches of commercial CrCl_{2} revealed the presence of trace nickel impurities in lower quality samples. It is now accepted that the reaction proceeds via the initial formation of an organonickel species which undergoes transmetallation to the active organochromium nucleophile. This mechanism should not be confused with the related Nozaki–Hiyama allylation, where allylchromium species add into an aldehyde without any nickel additives.

Owing to its mild conditions and broad functional-group tolerance, the NHTK reaction has found applications in several natural product syntheses. One particularly notable example is in Kishi's total synthesis of halichondrin B, where extensive application of the coupling was eventually adapted by Eisai into an industrial route for the FDA-approved anti-cancer drug eribulin.

Structures of halichondrin B (left) and eribulin (right) with bonds made by NHTK couplings highlighted in red.

=== Olefination reactions ===
==== Titanium-mediated olefinations ====
Takai's proposed catalytic cycle for the olefination of carbonyls with zinc and lead.

In 1987, Takai reported the synthesis of enol ethers via the olefination of esters. Building on previous studies with Nozaki, these transformations were hypothesized to involve a geminal dizinc intermediate. However, variable yields and reaction times dissuaded wide application of the method, and Lombardo would soon report an alternative procedure that involved "aging" the organozinc intermediate for several days, in what is now known as the Lombardo methylenation. Analysis of several batches of commercial zinc revealed that zinc produced via the pyrometallurgical process contained trace impurities of lead, which significantly altered the outcome of the methylenation. Takai subsequently reported that the methylenation proceeded quickly and reproducibly when catalytic PbCl_{2} was added to the reaction. It is believed that the mechanism involves formation of a α-iodozinc species which can rapidly transmetallate to the organolead, which then primes the system for a second oxidative addition into the remaining halide. Due to the similarities between Takai and Lombardo's conditions, this general transformation is often referred to as the Takai–Oshima–Lombardo methylenation.

Olefination of carbonyl compounds using a Zn/Pb/Ti system.

==== Chromium(II)-mediated olefinations ====
Isolated geminal dichromium species from Takai (top) alongside Anwander and Wener (bottom)

While attempting to synthesize geminal trichromium species from iodoform, Takai observed formation of (E)-iodostyrene when benzaldehyde was reacted with CrCl_{2} and iodoform. This observation led to the development of what is now known as the Takai–Utimoto olefination, where carbonyls can be converted to (E)-haloalkenes in the presence of CrCl_{2} and the corresponding trihalide. Like the corresponding organozinc reactions, the mechanism was hypothesized to involve a geminal dichromium intermediate, but the existence of such species was not proven until publications from Takai in 2017 alongside Anwander and Werner in 2018. However, unlike earlier zinc reactions, the Takai olefination exhibits a strong preference for the (E)-haloalkene, most likely due to stereoelectronic effects directly prior to oxygen elimination.

Proposed mechanism for the Takai–Utimoto olefination.

The formed haloalkenes are versatile synthetic intermediates that can be subjected to one-pot reaction conditions to rapidly build complex systems. One example was reported by Takai, where aldehydes can be subjected to tandem Takai–Utimoto/NHTK conditions to synthesize homologated allylic alcohols in decent yields. Later publications also report substituting the third iodide for heteroatoms or alkanes, allowing for the convenient synthesis of diverse (E)-substituted alkenes.

Modifications to the Takai–Utimoto olefination reported by Takai and coworkers

=== Organotantalum chemistry ===
In 1990, Takai and coworkers reported the partial reduction of alkynes to (Z)-olefins in the presence of TaCl_{5} and zinc. While the initial report involved protodemetallation of the intermediate metallocyclopropene, Takai published a series of subsequent reports that demonstrated the versatility of the organotantalum intermediate. By varying which trapping electrophile is added, a wide variety of functionalities can be synthesized. Notable examples include the synthesis of 1,4-dienes, (E)-allylic hydrazines, polysubstituted furans, (E)-allylic alcohols, and 1-naphthols. While these reactions generally proceed with favorable yields, varying levels of regioselectivity have hindered widespread use.

Abridged reactivity of tantalum-derived metallocyclopropenes.

=== Group 7 organometallics ===
Takai's group has also contributed to the development of group 7 catalysis, mainly focusing on organomanganese and organorhenium-based methods. Primarily focusing on bromotricarbonylrhenium(I) species, Takai demonstrated that these complexes are capable catalysts in a variety of transformations, highlighting their use as agents for C–H and C–C bond activation. Notably, these complexes were capable of forming stereodefined cyclopentenes, inserting terminal alkynes into β-ketoesters, enabling the deaminative annulation of imines to form subsitued indenes, and facilitating a variety of metal-mediated cycloadditions to form fused aromatic species.

Selected reactions of [ReBr(CO)3(THF)2]2 as reported by Takai.

While not catalytic, Takai and coworkers developed mild conditions for the activation of manganese powder, allowing for its application as a single electron reductant in several reactions. Despite possessing a stronger reduction potential than zinc, manganese metal was seldom used as a reductant due to its propensity of rapidly forming an oxide coating, and activated forms of the element were most commonly encountered as a Rieke metal. In 1996, Takai reported that commercial manganese was readily activated in the presence of trimethylsilyl chloride and catalytic PbCl_{2}. The activated manganese was a competent reductant and was capable of affecting Barbier allylations and Reformatsky-type reactions.

Selected applications of activated manganese reported by Takai and coworkers.

While Mn(0) is capable of reducing Pb(II), these reactions do not proceed solely in the presence of lead powder. The activated manganese was later shown to serve as a versatile reductant, capable of promoting 3-component couplings, cycloadditions, and cyclopropanations, among other reactions.
