= Tamejiro Hiyama =

Japanese organic chemist

- Born: August 24, 1946 (age 80); Ibaraki, Osaka, Japan
- Education: Kyoto University
- Known for: Nozaki-Hiyama-Kishi reaction Hiyama coupling
- Awards: The Chemical Society of Japan Award for Young Chemists (1980); The Bulletin of the Chemical Society of Japan Award (2001); The Japan Liquid Crystal Society Award (2004); The Society of Synthetic Organic Chemistry of Japan Award(2007); The Chemical Society of Japan Award (2008); Boehringer-Ingelheim Lectureship (2010); The Bulletin of the Chemical Society of Japan Award (2010); Humboldt Research Award (2012); Frederic Stanley Kipping Award in Silicon Chemistry, The American Chemical Society (2018)
- Scientific career
- Fields: Organic chemistry Organometallic chemistry
- Workplaces: Chuo University
- Doctoral advisor: Hitoshi Nozaki
- Website: www.chem.chuo-u.ac.jp/~omega300/index.html

Tamejiro Hiyama (born August 24, 1946) is a Japanese organic chemist. He is best known for his work in developing the Nozaki-Hiyama-Kishi reaction and the Hiyama coupling. He is currently a professor at the Chuo University Research and Development Initiative, and a Professor Emeritus of Kyoto University.

== Career ==
Hiyama received his Bachelor of Engineering (1969) and Master of Engineering (1971) from Kyoto University. He dropped out of the doctorate track in 1972, and subsequently started working as an assistant for Hitoshi Nozaki at Kyoto University. In 1975, he obtained his doctoral degree, and during 1975-1976 conducted postdoctoral research with Yoshito Kishi at Harvard University. In 1981, he started working at the Sagami Chemical Research Center, and became a principal investigator in 1983, and then chief laboratory manager in 1988.

In 1992, he re-entered the world of academia at the Tokyo Institute of Technology as a professor of the Research Laboratory of Resources Utilization. He then returned to Kyoto University in 1997 as a professor of engineering, until 2010 when he transferred to Chuo University, where he currently holds tenure.

His current research focuses on C-H activation and cross-coupling reactions. In particular, he is interested in ortho and benzylic C-H activation, and C-C, C-N, and C-Si bond formation via cross-coupling with organosilicon reagents.

== Major contributions ==
Hiyama is best known for developing:

- The Nozaki-Hiyama-Kishi reaction (NHK reaction) is a nickel/chromium mediated cross-coupling reaction between an allyl, vinyl or aryl halide and an aldehyde to form an alcohol upon aqueous workup.

It was originally discovered in 1977, where Hiyama and Nozaki reported a chemospecific synthesis of homoallyl alcohols from an aldehyde and allyl halide using chromium(II) chloride. In 1983, Hiyama and Nozaki published another paper extending the scope of the reaction to include aryl and vinyl halides. In 1986, Nozaki and Kishi independently discovered that the reaction depended on the nickel impurities in the chromium(II) chloride salt. Since then, nickel(II) chloride has been used as a co-catalyst.

The NHK reaction demonstrates high chemoselectivity towards aldehydes, as it tolerates a range of functional groups, and has been used on the process scale.

- The Hiyama coupling is a palladium-catalyzed cross-coupling reaction between aryl, alkenyl or alkyl halides and an organosilicon compound to form a C-C bond.

$$\begin{matrix}{}
\ce{{R-SiR''_3} + R'-X ->[\mathrm{F^-}][\text{Pd cat.}] R-R'}
\end{matrix}$$
- $\ce{R}$: Aryl, Alkenyl or Alkynyl
- $\ce{R'}$: Aryl, Alkenyl, Alkynyl or Alkyl
- $\ce{R''}$: Cl, F or Alkyl
- $\ce{X}$: Cl, Br, I or OTf

Hiyama developed this reaction in 1988. He says he developed this method in order to overcome the shortcomings of Grignard reagents. While Grignard reagents are powerful, Hiyama says, they can be hard to use in total synthesis as they are not as tolerant of other functional groups.

== Publications ==
He has published over 400 papers and 25 books over the course of his career.

Notable publications include:

- Tamejiro Hiyama and Koichiro Oshima, “有機合成化学” [Organic Synthetic Chemistry], Tokyo Kagaku Dojin, 2012, ISBN 978-4807907601
- G. S. Zweifel, M. H. Nantz, Tamejiro Hiyama, “最新有機合成法 設計と戦略 – Modern Organic Synthesis: An Introduction”, Kagaku Dojin, 2009, ISBN 978-4759811742
- Tamejiro Hiyama, coedited by Kyoko Nozaki, “有機合成のための触媒反応103” [103 Catalytic Reactions for Organic Synthesis], Tokyo Kagaku Dojin, 2004, ISBN 978-4807905867
- Tamejiro Hiyama, “Organofluorine Compounds: Chemistry and Applications”, Springer, 2000, ISBN 978-3-662-04164-2
- Tamejiro Hiyama, coedited with Martin Oestreich, “Organosilicon Chemistry: Novel Approaches and Reactions”, Wiley-VCH, 2019, ISBN 978-3-527-34453-6
- Tamejiro Hiyama, coedited by Kyoko Nozaki, Yoshiaki Nakao, and Koji Nakano, “有機合成のための新触媒反応101” [101 New Catalytic Reactions for Organic Synthesis], Tokyo Kagaku Dojin, 20021, ISBN 978-4-8079-2005-1

== See also ==
- Cross-Thorpe reaction
- Nozaki-Hiyama-Kishi reaction
- Hiyama coupling
- Oxidative Desulfurization Fluorination
- Carbostannylation of Alkynes and Alkenes
- Carbocyanation of Alkynes and Alkenes
