= Hiyama =

Hiyama may refer to:

- Hiyama (surname), a Japanese surname
- Hiyama Subprefecture, a subprefecture of Hokkaidō, Japan
- Hiyama District, Hokkaidō, a district in Hiyama Subprefecture

== See also ==
- Hiyama coupling, a carbon-carbon bond-forming reaction
- Nozaki–Hiyama–Kishi reaction, a carbon-carbon bond-forming reaction
