= Vinyl iodide functional group =

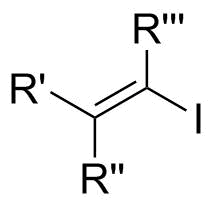
General structure of vinyl iodides

In organic chemistry, the vinyl iodide or iodoalkene functional group occurs when two carbon atoms are double-bonded to each other, and one carbon is bonded to an iodine atom. Synthesis of vinyl iodides with well-defined geometry is important in stereoselective synthesis of natural products and drugs. Unlike (saturated) alkyl iodides, vinyl iodides resist nucleophilic substitution, but retain iodine's easy reactivity under organometallic or redox conditions. Consequently, they appear in organic synthesis as protected vinyl anion synthons, and fragments for transition-metal catalyzed cross-coupling reactions.

== Properties ==
The C-I bond is the weakest of the halogens: the bond dissociation energy of C-I is 57.6 kcal/mol, while fluoride, chloride and bromide are 115, 83.7, 72.1 kcal/mol respectively.

As a result of having weaker bond, vinyl iodides do not polymerize as easily as their vinyl halide counterparts, but rather decompose and release iodide.

Vinyl iodides are generally stable to nucleophilic attack. In S_{N}2 reactions, back-attack is difficult because of steric clash of R groups on carbon adjacent to electrophilic center (see figure 1a). In addition, the lone pair on iodide donates into the π* of the alkene, which reduces electrophilic character on the carbon as a result of decreased positive charge. Also, this stereoelectronic effect strengthens the C-I bond, thus making removal of the iodide difficult (see figure 1b).

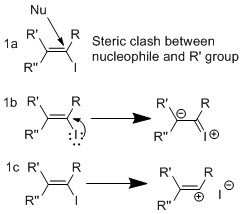
Figure 1.

In S_{N}1 case, dissociation is difficult because of the strengthened C-I bond and loss of the iodide will generate an unstable carbocation (see figure 1c). Nevertheless, if R' or R" in the diagram are hydrogen, then very strong bases can eliminate iodide to give an alkyne.

=== Redox reactions ===
Because the C-I bond is weak, vinyl iodides react to redox conditions. Magnesium-halogen exchange converts vinyl iodides Grignard reagents (see Scheme 1a), but requires higher temperatures and longer reaction time. Similar to Reformatsky enolates, electron-withdrawing groups can enhance the rate of exchange (see Scheme 1b); and the reaction is also enhanced with turbo-Grignard reagents (scheme 1c).

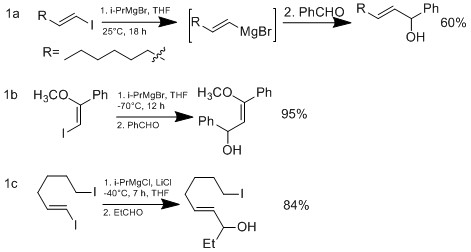
Scheme 1. Magnesium-halogen exchange

Vinyl iodides undergo oxidative addition quite easily. In noble-metal-catalyzed cross-coupling reactions, they react faster and under milder conditions than the corresponding chloride or bromide. Vinyl iodides rarely survive common reduction conditions, which produce an olefin or (further) an alkane, but there is literature evidence for the reduction of a propargyl alcohol without disturbing a vinyl iodide:

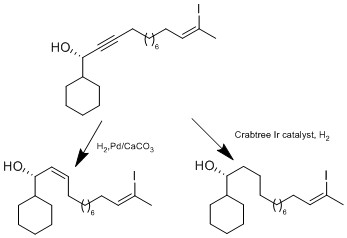
Parker's group reduction methods

== Synthesis ==
The common and simplest approach to make vinyl iodide adds one equivalent HI to an alkyne. By Markovnikov's rule, the substrate usually iodizes at the less substituted atom (an α-vinyl iodide). However, this reaction does not happen at good rates or very high stereoselectively. As a result, most synthetic methods often involve a hydrometalation step before I^{+} addition.

=== α-vinyl iodides ===
Introducing an α-vinyl iodide from a terminal position of an alkyne is a difficult step. in addition, the vinyl metal intermediate can be mildly nucleophilic, for example vinyl aluminum, can form C-C bonds under catalytic conditions. However, Hoveyda group have demonstrated using nickel-based catalyst (Ni(dppp)Cl_{2}), DIBAL-H with N-iodosuccinimide (NIS), selectively favor α-vinyl iodide with little to no byproducts. Also they observed reverse selectivity for β with Ni(PPh_{3})_{2}Cl_{2} in their hydroalumination reactions under same conditions with little or no byproducts. The advantage of this method is that is inexpensive (and commercially available), scalable and one-pot reaction.

Hoveyda'group hydroalumination method

Another method doesn't involve hydrometalation but hydroiodation with I_{2}/hydrophosphine binary system, which was developed by Ogawa's group.

Ogawa's group Hydroiodation method with I_{2}/hydrophosphine

The hydroiodation proceeds by Markovnikov-type adduct, no reaction is observed without addition of hydrophoshine. In a plausible mechanism proposed by Ogawa's group, the hydrophosphine reacts with HI to form an intermediate complex that coordinate HI to do Markovnikov hydroiodation on the alkene. The advantage of this system is the conditions are mild, can tolerate wide range of functional groups.

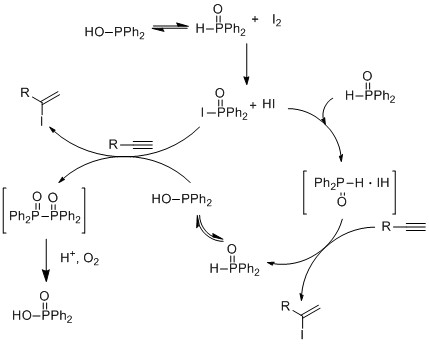
Mechanism Proposed by Ogawa's group

=== β-vinyl iodides ===
They are generally more methods in making β-vinyl iodides versus α-vinyl iodides using hydrometalation (with aluminum with DIBAL-H (hydroalumination), with boron (hydroboration), with HZrCp_{2}Cl (hydrozirconation)). However, hydrometalation with alkyne with various functional groups often react poorly with side products. The Chong groups have demonstrated using hydrostannation, using Bu_{3}SnH with palladium catalyst with high E stereoselectivity. They observed using sterically bulky ligands gave higher regioselectivity for β-vinyl iodide. The advantage of this technique is this technique can tolerate a wide range of functional groups.

Chong's group hydrostannation method

Z selective β-vinyl iodides are slightly more difficult to introduce than E-β-vinyl iodides, often requiring more than one step. Hydroalumination and hydroboration usually proceed by syn fashion, therefore selectively favors E geometry. The Oshima group have demonstrated using hydroindation with HInCl selectively favors Z geometry. They suggested that the reaction proceeds by a radical mechanism. They predict that HInCl adds to alkyne by radical addition in a Z geometry. It does not isomerized to E geometry because of low reactivity of radical InCl_{2} with intermediate complex (no second addition). If second addition occurs then isomerization will occur through diindium intermediate. They confirm a radical mechanism in a mechanistic study with alkyne and alkene cyclization.

Oshima's group hydroindation method

=== Substitution ===
Substitution is perhaps most useful method in introducing vinyl iodide into the molecule. Halogen-exchange can be useful since vinyl iodides are more reactivity than other vinyl halides. Buchwald group demonstrates a halogen-exchange from vinyl bromide to vinyl iodide with copper catalyst under mild conditions. It is possible that this method can tolerate various functional groups since these conditions were tested aryl halides initially. The scope of this exchange for regiochemistry and stereochemistry is currently unexplored.

Buchwald's group halogen exchange method

Halogen-exchange can also be done with zirconium derivatives that retain olefin's geometry

Marek's group Halogen exchange method

The Marek group have further investigated using zirconium catalyst on E or Z vinyl ethers, which selective for E-vinyl ethers. The zirconium's oxophilic nature allows elimination alkoxy group at the β position to form intermediate vinyl zirconium complex. The E geometry selectivity is not cause by sterics but rather the reaction itself is not concerted. In a mechanistic study, they observed isomerization, which suggest E geometry product is more favored than Z geometry. The difference of results between halogen exchange and E-vinyl ether reaction is that only when there is a presence of an oxonium intermediate, is isomerization observed.

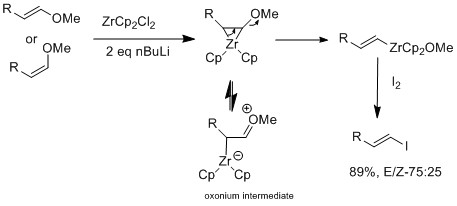
Marek's group zirconium vinyl iodide synthesis from vinyl ether

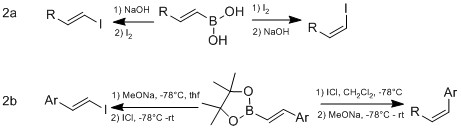
Scheme 2.

An interesting substitution reaction is vinyl boronic acid to vinyl iodide done by Brown's group. Depending on order of addition of iodide or base, vinyl borate can yield different stereoisomers of vinyl iodide (see scheme 2a). The Whiting group, however, noticed that Brown's method was not applicable to more sterically hindered boronic esters (no reaction). They proposed that the iodide source was not electropositive enough. So they decided to use ICl which is more polar than I_{2}, in which, they observed similar results (see scheme 2b).

Radical substitution of carboxylic acid to iodide is demonstrated by a modified Hunsdiecker reaction. Homolytic cleavage of O-I bond generates CO_{2} and vinyl radical. Vinyl radical recombines with iodide radical to form vinyl iodide.

Modified Hunsdiecker reaction

==== Iododesilylation ====
Iododesilylation is a substitution reaction of silyl group for iodide. The advantages of iododesilylation are that it avoids toxic tin reagent and intermediate vinyl silyl are stable, nontoxic and easily handled and stored. Vinyl silyl can be made from terminal alkyne or other methods.

The Kishi's group reported a mild preparation of vinyl iodide from vinyl silyl using NIS in mixture of acetonitrile and chloroacetonitrile. They observed retention of olefin geometry in some vinyl silyl substrates while inversion in others. They reasoned that the R group's size had an effect on the geometry of the olefin. If the R group is small, the solvent acetonitrile can participate in the reaction leading to inversion of the olefin's geometry. If the R group is big, the solvent is unable to participate, leading to retention of olefin's geometry

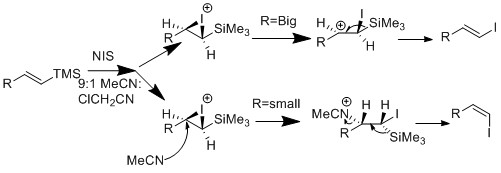
Kishi's group iododesilylation method

Zakarian's group then decided to run the reaction in HFIP, which gave high retention of olefin geometry. They reasoned that HFIP is a low nucleophilicity solvent, unlike acetonitrile. In addition, they observed accelerated reaction rate because HFIP activate NIS by hydrogen bonding.

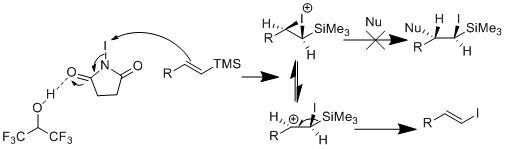
Zakarian's group HFIP iododesilylation method

Unfortunately, iododesilylation under those conditions (above) can potentially yield multiple byproducts in highly functionalized molecules with oxygen functional groups. Vilarrasa and Costa's group hypothesized that radical reactions producing HI and I_{2} help facilitate cleavage in alcohol's protecting group and may add into other alkene bonds. They experimented with the use of silver additives such as silver acetate and silver carbonate in which the silver can react with the excess iodide to form silver iodide. They achieved better conversions with these conditions.

=== Name reactions ===
Some famous vinyl iodide synthesis methods involve conversion of aldehyde or ketone to vinyl iodide. Barton's hydrazone iodination method involves addition of hydrazines to aldehyde or ketone to form hydrazone. Then the hydrazone is converted to vinyl iodide by addition of iodide and DBU. This method has been used in natural product synthesis of Taxol by Danishefsky and Cortistatin A by Shair. Another method is the Takai olefination which uses iodoform and chromium(II) chloride to make vinyl iodide from aldehyde with high stereoselectivity for E geometry. For high stereoselectivity for Z geometry, Stork-Zhao olefination proceeds by Wittig-like reaction. High yields and Z stereoselectivity occurred at low temperature and at the presence of HMPA.

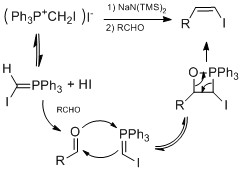
Stork-Zhao Olefination

Below is example of employing both Takai olefination and Stork-Zhao olefination in total synthesis of (+)-3-(E)- and (+)-3-(Z)-Pinnatifidenyne.

Employment of Takai and Stork-Zhao olefination by Kim's group

=== Elimination method ===
Rarely do geminal diiodides eliminate to a vinyl iodide, instead decomposing to an unsubstituted alkene and iodide. The reaction can occur with a better electrofuge, as during decarboxylation:

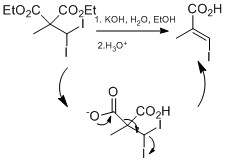
Baker's group elimination method

== See also ==
- List of functional groups
- Group contribution method
