= Allyl halide =

Allyl halides are a class of compounds in organic chemistry whose members contain a halogen atom in the allylic position, i.e., bonded to a carbon atom that is itself directly bonded to a double bond. In the narrower sense, they are monohalogenated derivatives of propene, namely allyl fluoride (Allyl fluoride), allyl chloride, allyl bromide, and allyl iodide.

== Production ==
Selective bromination of alkenes in the allyl position is possible using Wohl-Ziegler bromination. An alternative reagent is N-bromo-tert-butylamine. Allylic chlorination of alkenes can be carried out with N-chlorosuccinimide and phenylselenyl chloride or via a radical pathway with tert-butyl hypochlorite under irradiation or, in the case of terminal alkenes, with cerium(III) chloride and sodium hypochlorite accompanied by rearrangement of the double bond. Allylic iodides can be prepared from allyl alcohols by reaction with sodium iodide / boron trifluoride etherate or with sodium iodide / trimethylsilyl chloride. Allyl fluorides can be prepared from allyl alcohols, with the most commonly used reagent by far being diethylaminosulfur trifluoride. Less frequently used alternatives include Yarovenko's reagent; N,N-Diisopropyl-1-fluoro-2-methylpropenamine; a reagent system consisting of iodine pentafluoride, hydrogen fluoride and triethylamine; or sulfur tetrafluoride. Substitution of chlorine or bromine atoms or tosyl groups with fluorine is also possible, for example using tetrabutylammonium fluoride or lead(II) fluoride. Allylic fluorination of alkenes can be achieved with electrophilic fluorinating agents, for example acetyl hypofluorite, N-fluoropyridinium triflate, various other N-fluorinated pyridinium compounds, as well as Accufluor and Selectfluor. Furthermore, allyl fluorides can be produced by forming a double bond, for example via the Horner-Wadsworth-Emmons reaction of α-fluorinated aldehydes and ketones. Finally, reduction of the corresponding propargyl group is also possible.

One method for the preparation of primary allyl halides is the reaction of a ketone with vinyl magnesium bromide in tetrahydrofuran, followed by halogenation of the resulting allyl alcohol with a carboxylic acid halide (acetyl chloride or acetyl bromide) in dichloromethane.

== Reactions ==
Allyl halides can be converted into the corresponding organometallic compounds, which can be used to transform carbonyl compounds into homoallyl alcohols by allylation. This enables reactions such as the Barbier reaction or reactions involving low-valent chromium. In addition, allyl halides such as allyl chloride, allyl bromide and allyl iodide can be converted into Grignard reagents, which can likewise be used for the synthesis of homoallyl alcohols. The use of a catalytic amount of titanium dichloride suppresses Wurtz coupling as a side reaction.

Allylic iodides (generated in situ if necessary) are suitable for the generation of nucleophilic allylation reagents (reaction with zinc, umpolung and subsequent Barbier-type reaction) or can be used directly as electrophilic allylation agents. They can be converted into allylic azides with sodium azide, into unsaturated nitriles with cyanides, or into sulphones.

Allyl bromides can be converted into iodalkynes by homologization with sodium hexamethyldisilazide and iodoform. Allyl fluorides can participate in many reactions typical of alkenes, including cycloaddition, formation of epoxides, dihydroxylation, ozonolysis, bromination or hydrogenation.

Allyl halides can be used for the preparation of allyl metal complexes, for example of iron, nickel, cobalt, palladium and platinum.
