= René Peters =

René Peters may refer to:

- René Peters (footballer)
- René Peters (chemist)
