= Altohyrtin A =

Naturally occurring chemical compound

Identifiers
3D model (JSmol)	Interactive image
ChemSpider	8139269
PubChem CID	6439494
- InChI: InChI=1S/C63H95ClO21/c1-33(19-42(67)18-17-35(3)64)20-53-55(72)57-39(7)58(79-53)59(73)63(75)31-51(70)37(5)52(85-63)16-14-12-13-15-44-22-43(68)27-61(81-44)29-47(76-11)23-45(82-61)25-50(69)38(6)56(78-41(9)66)36(4)34(2)21-49-28-60(10,74)32-62(84-49)30-48(77-40(8)65)24-46(83-62)26-54(71)80-57/h13,15,17-18,36-39,42-49,51-53,55-59,67-68,70,72-75H,1-3,12,14,16,19-32H2,4-11H3/b15-13-,18-17+/t36-,37-,38-,39-,42-,43+,44+,45+,46-,47+,48+,49+,51+,52-,53-,55-,56+,57-,58-,59+,60+,61-,62-,63-/m1/s1; Key: ICXJVZHDZFXYQC-XKQUEHJYSA-N
- SMILES: C=C(C[C@H]([C@@H](O)[C@@H]1OC(C[C@@H]2O[C@@]3(O[C@@H](CC([C@H]([C@@H]([C@@H](C(C[C@H]4O[C@]5(C[C@@H](O)C[C@H](/C=C\CCC[C@H]6O[C@]7(O)C[C@H](O)[C@H]6C)O5)C[C@@H](OC)C4)=O)C)OC(C)=O)C)=C)C[C@@](O)(C)C3)C[C@@H](OC(C)=O)C2)=O)O[C@@]([C@@H]1C)([H])[C@@H]7O)C[C@H](O)/C=C/C(Cl)=C

Properties
Chemical formula	C_{63}H_{95}ClO_{21}
Molar mass	1223.88 g·mol^{−1}
- Except where otherwise noted, data are given for materials in their standard state (at 25 °C [77 °F], 100 kPa). verify (what is ?) Infobox references

Altohyrtin A (spongistatin 1, cinachyrolide A) is a polyether macrolide originally isolated from the Okinawan marine sponge Hyrtios altum by Kobayashi et al. in 1993, It was also found in an Indian species of Spongia by Pettit et al, and in a Japanese species of Cinachyra by Fusetani et al. It has potent anti-cancer activity.

== Mechanism of action ==
Altohyrtin A binds to the maytansine/rhizoxin site on microtubules.

== Biosynthesis ==
While a producer organism for Altohyrtin A has never been isolated in pure culture, the structural features of Altohyrtin A, such as the 'odd-even' rule of methylation, and the abundance of oxygen heterocycles, suggest it is a product of dinoflagellate polyether metabolism. Alternatively, it may be bacterial in origin.

== See also ==
- Halichondrin B
