= Cross electrophile coupling =

Cross-coupling reaction between two electrophiles

Cross electrophile coupling (XEC or sometimes CEC) is a type of cross-coupling reaction that occurs between two electrophiles. It is often catalyzed by transition metal catalyst(s). Unlike conventional cross-coupling reactions of an electrophile with an organometallic reagent, the coupling partners in cross electrophile coupling reactions are both electrophiles. Generally, additional reductant to regenerate active catalyst is needed in this reaction.

== Cross selectivity ==
Reductive dimerization of electrophiles has long been known (Wurtz reaction, Ullman reaction, etc.), Few methods exist for achieving cross selectivity.

=== Using excess of one reagent ===
Using excess amount of one reagent can provide synthetically useful yields of cross-coupled product when the starting reagents have similar reactivity. (e.g. coupling between two alkyl halides). This strategy has been used with a Ni catalyst and zinc as reductant. Dimerization of the more reactive alkyl halide was the major byproduct.

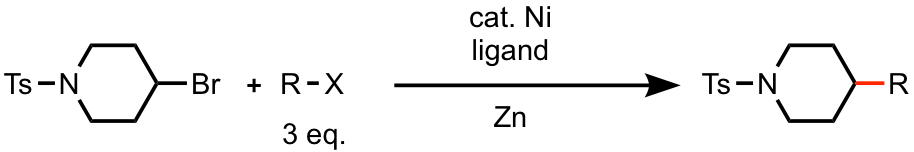

Alkyl-alkyl (Csp3-Csp3) cross electrophile coupling using metallaphotoredox catalysis has also been achieved. In this case, small alkyl electrophiles were used excess amount. Tris(trimethylsilyl)silanol can be employed as a halogen abstractor in combination with photoredox and Ni catalysis.

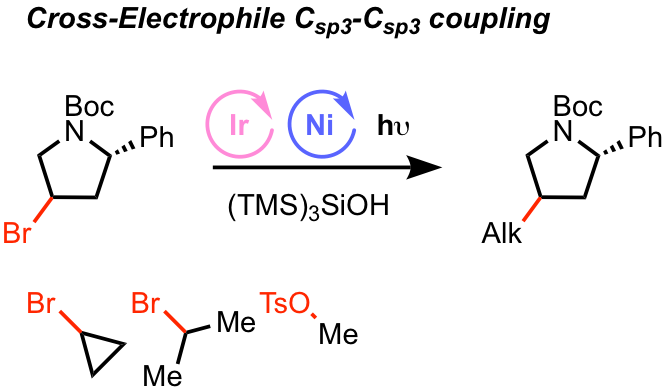

=== Sequential oxidative addition ===
In cases where two electrophiles have disparate reactivity, this difference can be used to achieve high selectivity for cross product.

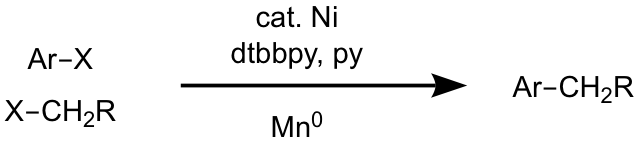

For example, aryl halide and alkyl halide can be differentiated by the reactivity trends of two electrophiles whether it prefers heterolytic or homolytic pathway. Through detailed mechanistic studies, the origin of high selectivity was revealed : Aryl halides do faster oxidative addition to Ni(0) center than alkyl halides, however, alkyl halides form radicals when it react with nickel center. The catalysis begins with oxidative addition of an aryl halide to Ni(0). The resulting Ni(II) species reacts with an alkyl radical generated from alkyl halides to form diorganonickel(III) intermediate which can undergo reductive elimination of the cross coupled product. Reduction of Ni(II) to Ni(0) by Mn closes the catalytic cycle.

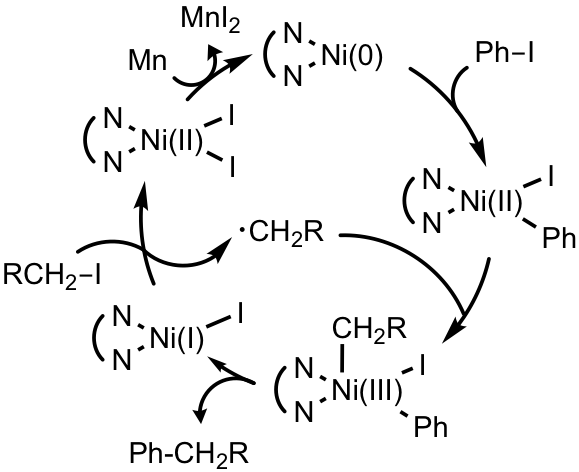

Reductive cross coupling of two different aryl (pseudo)halide was achieved. Use of two different metals (Ni and Pd) was essential for the observed cross-selectivity of chemically similar two reactants. Aryl triflates generally prefer oxidative addition to the electron-rich Pd(0) catalyst whereas Ni(0) selectively reacts with aryl bromides.

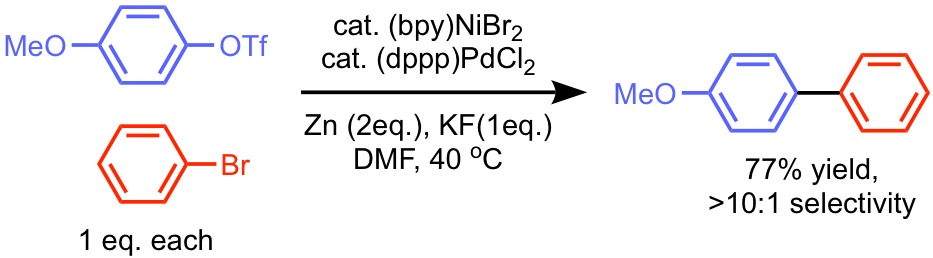

Transmetallation of the aryl-nickel(II) onto the Aryl-palladium(II) forms a Pd(II)Ar1Ar2 species followed by reductive elimination to give product. Finally, reduction of Ni(II) by additive zinc regenerates Ni(0).

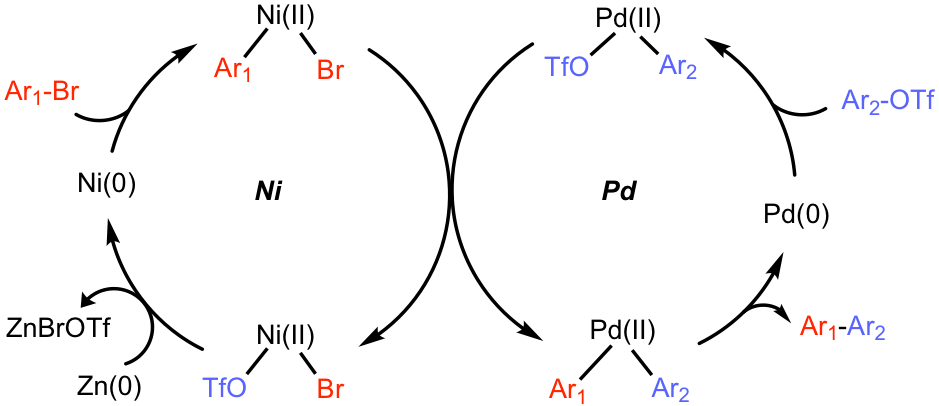
