= Nozaki–Hiyama–Kishi reaction =

Coupling reaction used in organic synthesis

Nozaki-Hiyama-Kishi reaction
Named after	Hitoshi Nozaki; Tamejiro Hiyama; Yoshito Kishi
Reaction type	Coupling reaction

Identifiers
Organic Chemistry Portal	nozaki-hiyama-coupling
RSC ontology ID	RXNO:0000191

The Nozaki–Hiyama–Kishi reaction is a nickel/chromium coupling reaction forming an alcohol from the reaction of an aldehyde with an allyl or vinyl halide. In their original 1977 publication, Tamejiro Hiyama and Hitoshi Nozaki reported on a chromium(II) salt solution prepared by reduction of chromic chloride by lithium aluminium hydride to which was added benzaldehyde and allyl chloride:

Compared to Grignard reactions, this reaction is very selective towards aldehydes with large tolerance towards a range of functional groups such as ketones, esters, amides and nitriles. Enals give exclusively 1,2-addition. Solvents of choice are DMF and DMSO, one solvent requirement is solubility of the chromium salts. Nozaki–Hiyama–Kishi reaction is a useful method for preparing medium-size rings.

In 1983 the scope was extended by the same authors to include vinyl halides or triflates and aryl halides. It was observed that the success of the reaction depended on the source of chromium(II) chloride and in 1986 it was found that this is due to nickel impurities. Since then nickel(II) chloride is used as a co-catalyst.

In the same year Yoshito Kishi et al. independently discovered the beneficial effects of nickel in his quest for palytoxin:

Palladium acetate was also found to be an effective cocatalyst.

== Reaction mechanism ==
Nickel is the actual catalyst when small amounts of a nickel salt are added to the reaction. Nickel(II) chloride is first reduced to nickel(0) with 2 equivalents of chromium(II) chloride (as sacrificial catalyst) leaving chromium(III) chloride. The next step is oxidative addition of nickel into the carbon to halide bond forming an alkenylnickel R–Ni(II)–X intermediate followed by a transmetallation step exchanging NiX with a Cr(III) group to an alkenylchromium R–Cr(III)–X intermediate and regenerating Ni(II). This species reacts with the carbonyl group in a nucleophilic addition.

The amount of nickel used should be low as a direct alkene coupling to a diene is a side reaction.

Related reactions are the Grignard reaction (magnesium), the Barbier reaction (zinc) and addition reactions involving organolithium reagents.
