= Hiyama coupling =

Chemical reaction

Named after	Tamejiro Hiyama
Reaction type	Coupling reaction

Identifiers
Organic Chemistry Portal	hiyama-coupling
RSC ontology ID	RXNO:0000193

Examples and Related Reactions
Similar reactions	Hiyama-Denmark coupling

The Hiyama coupling is a palladium-catalyzed cross-coupling reaction of organosilanes with organic halides used in organic chemistry to form carbon–carbon bonds (C-C bonds). This reaction was discovered in 1988 by Tamejiro Hiyama and Yasuo Hatanaka as a method to form carbon-carbon bonds synthetically with chemo- and regioselectivity. The Hiyama coupling has been applied to the synthesis of various natural products.

$$\begin{matrix}{}\\
\ce{{R-SiR''_3} + R'-X ->[\mathrm{F^-}][\text{Pd cat.}] R-R'}
\end{matrix}$$
- $\ce{R}$: aryl, alkenyl or alkynyl
- $\ce{R'}$: aryl, alkenyl, alkynyl or alkyl
- $\ce{R''}$: Cl, F or alkyl
- $\ce{X}$: Cl, Br, I or OTf

== Reaction history ==
The Hiyama coupling was developed to combat the issues associated with other organometallic reagents. The initial reactivity of organosilicon was not actually first reported by Hiyama, as Kumada reported a coupling reaction using organofluorosilicates shown below. Organosilanes were then discovered, by Hiyama, to have reactivity when activated by a fluoride source. This reactivity, when combined with a palladium salt, creates a carbon-carbon bond with an electrophillic carbon, like an organic halide. Compared to the inherent issues of well-used organometalics reagents, such as organomagnesium (Grignard reagents) and organocopper reagents, which are very reactive and are known to have low chemoselectivity, enough to destroy functional groups on both coupling partners, organosilicon compounds are inactive. Other organometallic reagents using metals such as zinc, tin, and boron, reduce the reactivity issue, but have other problems associated with each reagent. Organozinc reagents are moisture sensitive, organotin compounds are toxic, and organoboron reagents are not readily available, are expensive, and aren't often stable. Organosilanes are readily available compounds that, upon activation (much like organotin or organoboron compounds) from fluoride or a base, can react with organohalides to form C-C bonds in a chemo- and regioselective manner. The reaction first reported was used to couple easily made (and activated) organosilicon nucleophiles and organohalides (electrophiles) in the presence of a palladium catalyst. Since this discovery, work has been done by various groups to expand the scope of this reaction and to "fix" the issues with this first coupling, such as the need for fluoride activation of the organosilane.

Silicate coupling precedent for development of the Hiyama coupling

== Mechanism ==
The organosilane is activated with fluoride (as some sort of salt such as TBAF or TASF) or a base to form a pentavalent silicon center which is labile enough to allow for the breaking of a C-Si bond during the transmetalation step. The general scheme to form this key intermediate is shown below. This step occurs in situ or at the same time as the catalytic cycle in the reaction.

The mechanism for the Hiyama coupling follows a catalytic cycle, including an A) oxidative addition step, in which the organic halide adds to the palladium oxidizing the metal from palladium(0) to palladium(II); a B) transmetalation step, in which the C-Si bond is broken and the second carbon fragment is bound to the palladium center; and finally C) a reductive elimination step, in which the C-C bond is formed and the palladium returns to its zero-valent state to start the cycle over again. The catalytic cycle is shown below.

The Catalytic Cycle of the Hiyama coupling

== Scope and limitations ==
=== Scope ===
The Hiyama coupling can be applied to the formation of C_{sp}2-C_{sp}2 (e.g. aryl–aryl) bonds as well as C_{sp}2-C_{sp}3 (e.g. aryl–alkyl) bonds. Good synthetic yields are obtained with couplings of aryl halides, vinyl halides, and allylic halides and organoiodides afford the best yields.

The scope of this reaction was expanded to include closure of medium-sized rings by Scott E. Denmark.

Hiyama coupling as a ring-closing reaction. Note that in fact a side reaction producing a 10-carbon-atom ring will dominate when using these reagents.

The coupling of alkyl halides with organohalosilanes as alternative organosilanes has also been performed. Organochlorosilanes allow couplings with aryl chlorides, which are abundant and generally more economical than aryl iodides. A nickel catalyst allows for access to new reactivity of organotrifluorosilanes as reported by GC Fu et al. Secondary alkyl halides are coupled with aryl silanes with good yields using this reaction.

The Nickel-catalyzed Hiyama coupling as discovered by GC Fu et al.

=== Limitations ===
The Hiyama coupling is limited by the need for fluoride in order to activate the organosilicon reagent. Addition of fluoride cleaves any silicon protecting groups (e.g. silyl ethers), which are frequently employed in organic synthesis. The fluoride ion is also basic, so base sensitive protecting groups, acidic protons, and functional groups may be affected by the addition of this activator. Most of the active research concerning this reaction involves circumventing this problem. To overcome this issue, many groups have looked to the use of other basic additives for activation, or use of a different organosilane reagent all together, leading to the multiple variations of the original Hiyama coupling.

== Variations ==
One modification of the Hiyama coupling utilizes a silacyclobutane ring and a fluoride source that is hydrated as shown below. This mimics the use of an alkoxysilane/organosilanol rather than the use of alkylsilane. The mechanism of this reaction, using a fluoride source, allowed for the design of future reactions that can avoid the use of the fluoride source.

Proposed transition state of Denmark's Hiyama coupling of silacyclobutanes

=== Fluoride-free Hiyama couplings ===
Many modifications to the Hiyama coupling have been developed that avoid the use of a fluoride activator/base. Using organochlorosilanes, Hiyama found a coupling scheme utilizing NaOH as the basic activator. Modifications using alkoxysilanes have been reported with the use of milder bases like NaOH and even water. Study of these mechanisms have led to the development of the Hiyama–Denmark coupling which utilize organosilanols as coupling partners.

NaOH-promoted Hiyama coupling

Another class of fluoride-free Hiyama couplings include the use of a Lewis acid additive, which allows for bases such as K_{3}PO_{4} to be utilized, or for the reaction to proceed without a basic additive. The addition of a copper co-catalyst has also been reported to allow for the use of a milder activating agent and has even been shown to get turnover in which both the palladium(II) and copper(I) turnover in the catalytic cycle rather than addition of stoichiometric Lewis acid (e.g. silver(I), copper(I)).

Hiyama coupling with a copper co-catalyst

=== Hiyama–Denmark coupling ===
The Hiyama–Denmark coupling is the modification of the Hiyama coupling that does not require a fluoride additive to utilize organosilanols and organic halides as coupling partners. The general reaction scheme is shown below, showcasing the utilization of a Brønsted base as the activating agent as opposed to fluoride, phosphine ligands are also used on the metal center.

General scheme of the Hiyama–Denmark coupling

A specific example of this reaction is shown with reagents. If fluoride had been used, as in the original Hiyama protocol, the tert-butyldimethylsilyl (TBS) ether would have likely been destroyed.

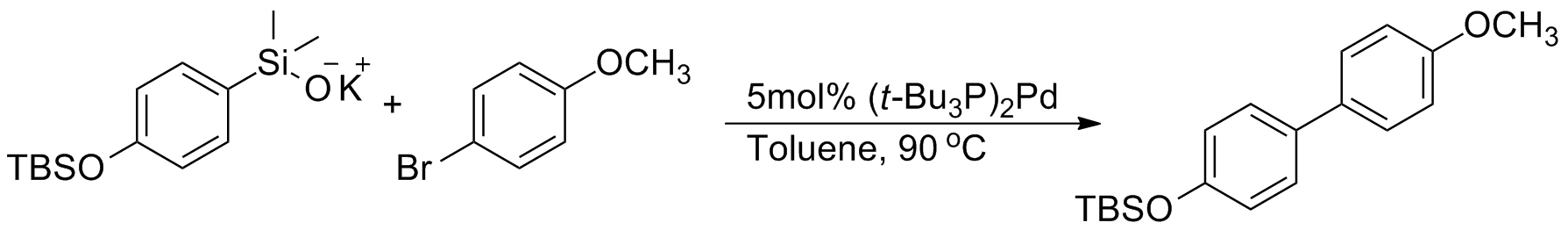
Example of silanol coupling without fluoride additives

==== Hiyama–Denmark coupling mechanism ====
Examination of this reaction's mechanism suggests that the formation of the silonate is all that is needed to activate addition of the organosilane to the palladium center. The presence of a pentavalent silicon is not needed and kinetic analysis has shown that this reaction has first order dependence on silonate concentration. This is due to the key bond being formed, the Pd-O bond during the transmetalation step, that then allows for transfer of the carbon fragment onto the palladium center. Based on this observation, it seems that the rate limiting step in this catalytic cycle is the Pd-O bond formation, in which increased silonate concentrations increase the rate of this reaction (indicative of faster reactions).

Catalytic cycle of the Hiyama–Denmark coupling

== See also ==
- Heck reaction
- Kumada coupling
- Negishi coupling
- Sonogashira coupling
- Stille reaction
- Suzuki reaction
- Palladium-catalyzed coupling reactions
