= Hiyama (surname) =

Hiyama (written: 檜山, 日山, 桧山, or 肥山) is a Japanese surname. Notable people with the surname include:

- Emiko Hiyama (肥山 詠美子), Japanese physicist
- Masaaki Hiyama (日山 正明, born 1959), Japanese jazz drummer
- Nobuyuki Hiyama (檜山 修之, born 1967), Japanese voice actor
- Shinjiro Hiyama (桧山 進次郎, born 1969), Japanese baseball player
- Tamejiro Hiyama (born 1946), Japanese chemist
