= Hitoshi Nozaki =

Japanese chemist (1922–2019)

Hitoshi Nozaki 野崎 一
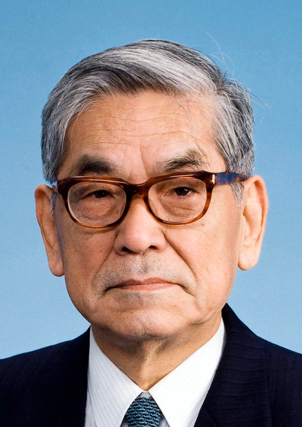
- Hitoshi Nozaki
- Born: 1922; Okayama, Japan
- Died: September 25, 2019 (aged 97)
- Education: Kyoto Imperial University
- Known for: Nozaki–Hiyama–Kishi reaction
- Awards: Japan Academy Prize (1986); Order of the Sacred Treasure (1992)
- Scientific career
- Fields: Organic chemistry
- Workplaces: Kyoto University; Okayama University of Science
- Doctoral students: Ryoji Noyori; Tamejiro Hiyama
- Other notable students: Yoshito Kishi; Kazuhiko Takai

Hitoshi Nozaki (野崎 一, Nozaki Hitoshi; 1922 – September 25, 2019), sometimes spelled Hitosi, was a Japanese chemist specializing in the field of organic chemistry, known as the head of Japanese organic chemistry research, and one of the discoverers of Nozaki–Hiyama–Kishi reaction. He was Emeritus Professor of Kyoto University.

== Life ==
Nozaki was born in Okayama, Japan, in 1922. He received his BS and PhD degree, respectively, from the Kyoto Imperial University.

=== Contributions ===
In Japan, Hitoshi Nozaki was one of the leaders of the organic chemistry academic circles during the period of Japanese post-war economic miracle.

- Terpene-based synthetic of carboxylic cation
- Nozaki–Hiyama–Kishi reaction

=== Notable students ===
- Ryoji Noyori: 2001 Nobel Prize in Chemistry winner.
- Yoshito Kishi: Professor at Harvard University.
- Kazuhiko Takai: Professor at Okayama University.

== Recognition ==
- 1979 Chemistry Society of Japan(CSJ) Award
- 1986 Japan Academy Prize
- 1986 Medal with Purple Ribbon
- 1992 Order of the Sacred Treasure
- 1993 Special Award in Synthetic Organic Chemistry, Japan
- 1999 Member of Japan Academy
