= Takai-Oshima-Lombardo methylenation =

Named after	Kazuhiko Takai, Koichiro Oshima, Luciano Lombardo
Reaction type	Methylenation reaction

The Takai-Oshima-Lombardo methylenation transfers the corresponding methylene from the dihalomethylene reagent, whereas the wittig methylenation transfers from a phosphonium ylide, requiring much more strongly basic conditions to prepare.

The Takai-Oshima-Lombardo methylidenation refers to reactions involving a combination of zinc, a dihalomethane, and titanium tetrachloride to perform methylenation of carbonyl derivatives. This reagent system was originally reported by Kazuhiko Takai and Koichiro Oshima, later elaborated upon by Luciano Lombardo, with a variation which is notable for its increased activity, milder nature, and greater compatibility with acidic protons in substrate molecules compared to the system originally reported. The Lombardo modification involves a longer period for the preparation of active reagent in the absence of lead catalyst which is necessary for the high yields reported in Takai and Oshima's original work. The structure of the active reagent is unknown in both cases, but has been speculated upon and likely contains a titanium alkylidene species similar to those involved in the Tebbe and Petasis methylenations. These methodologies provide an exceptionally mild and selective set of conditions amenable to late-stage methylenation of complex scaffolds with unprotected acidic C-H functionality, thus complementing existing anionic methylenation chemistry such as the Wittig reaction.

== History ==
The initial report of methylenation conditions employing the zinc, dibromomethane, and titanium tetrachloride was disclosed by Takai, Oshima, and coworkers in 1978, alongside conditions using diiodomethane, zinc, and trimethylaluminum for the methylenation of ketones. Although the mechanism and speciation of reagents in this reaction were not determined at the time, trapping studies with trimethylchlorostannane implicated the intermediacy of a dimetallic complex of the form H_{2}C(ZnI)_{2}. An additional control experiment with a preformed iodohydrin and zinc metal did not deliver the desired methylenation product, indicating a mechanism other than anionic displacement. These findings left the role of trimethylaluminum unclear, as it was imagined that the pathway could involve this species merely as a Lewis acid to further activate the presumed intermediate alkoxide for elimination, rather than involving another intermediate organometallic aluminum reagent.

Capture of a distannylated compound under the reaction conditions suggests the formation of a methylene dianion equivalent as an intermediate. Treatment of a premade iodohydrin with zinc provided protodehalogenation over elimination.

Under the same reaction conditions with titanium tetrachloride instead of trimethylaluminum the same methylenation of ketones is possible. It was further noted that the use of titanium tetrachloride worked in the presence of dibromomethane instead of diiodomethane, which is a preferable alternative due to lesser susceptibility to photolysis. It was noted that both systems can be effective alternatives for the methylenation of ketones by the Wittig reaction.

Studies undertaken by L. Lombardo determined that his modification of the Takai-Oshima procedure allowed for methylenation of an alpha-chiral gibberellin derivative without stereochemical inversion, which occurred using the analogous Wittig reagent.

Following the initial disclosure from Takai and Oshima, Lombardo published a modified procedure in 1982 reporting that the yield of reaction and tolerance of substrates could be augmented by preparing the active reagent in advance at low temperature over an extended period. The modification consisted of premixing the zinc and dibromoethane at a reduced temperature of -40 °C for several hours followed by dropwise addition of titanium tetrachloride, and allowing that mixture to come to 0 °C followed by stirring for several days at this temperature prior to use. Addition of substrates to this mixture including enolizable alpha-chiral ketones with known base sensitivity resulted in rapid methylenation with increased yield relative to the original procedure, which was ineffective on the chosen substrates.

Following this, a method for chemoselective methylenation of ketones in the presence of aldehydes and for aldehydes in the presence of ketones was disclosed by Takai in 1985 using a similar system of reagents. It was determined that the use of zinc, diiodomethane, and either trimethylaluminum or titanium isopropoxide would be selective for methylenation of aldehydes over ketones. The selectivity could be reversed by pretreatment of the aldehyde with titanium diethylamide.

Takai reported conditions which allowed the inversion of the default chemoselectivity of the reaction to allow for selective methylenation of ketones over aldehydes through the use of pretreatment with titanium diethylamide.

Additional studies from Takai on this system for methylenation in 1987 revealed that slightly modified conditions involving TMEDA considerably changed the reactivity of the reagent. Preliminary mixing of titanium tetrachloride with TMEDA followed by addition of zinc prior to the addition of dibromomethane at room temperature generated a reagent which allowed for methylenation of esters to provide Z alkenyl ethers. This method was then expanded to silyl enol ethers from silyl esters in an additional 1987 disclosure, as well as Z alkenyl sulfides from thioesters and E enamines from amides in a 1998 report, all utilizing the same conditions with critical dependence on TMEDA. Although the mechanism was not determined, it is presumed that a Tebbe/Petasis like titanium alkylidene is responsible for this reactivity.

Takai and coworkers reported an additional variation which allowed for the attack of carboxylic acid derivatives to form enol ethers, alkenyl sulfides, and enamines through attack of esters, thioesters, and amides respectively. The variation requires pre-complexation of the active reagent with TMEDA prior to addition of the carboxylic acid derivatives.

== Importance of lead ==
The presence of catalytic amounts of lead significantly accelerates the formation of the dianionic methylene intermediate.

In 1994, Takai communicated the finding that trace lead impurities in the zinc used for the reaction were catalytically active (in concentrations of approximately 0.04 mol%), and essential for rapid and effective use of these reagents. It was determined through NMR studies that formation of the methylene dizinc bromide complex was incredibly slow in the absence of these lead impurities. Doping of the reaction mixture with lead dichloride resulted in considerable increase in reaction rate and yield. It was posited that transmetalation of the mono zinc bromide reagent with lead allows for more facile oxidative addition to form the second methylene metal bond, due to increased covalency of the lead-carbon bond compared to the zinc-carbon bond. This significantly increases the rate of generation of the methylene dianion equivalent which is essential for methylenation activity on the time scale of hours instead of days. It was thus determined that addition of around 1 mol% of lead dichloride significantly increases rate of reaction and is necessary for the behavior originally reported by Takai and Oshima. Due to the long premixing period of the Lombardo variation, it is unclear whether the lead catalyst is necessary.

== Mechanism ==
Potential mechanisms for the Takai-Oshima-Lombardo methylenation include anionic addition followed by lewis acid activation and elimination (top) as well as titanium alkylidene metathesis to form the methylenated compound and titanium oxide derivatives. (bottom)

Although the mechanism of the Takai-Oshima-Lombardo methylenation has not been completely determined, key findings have been noted in the initial disclosures of this reaction and its variants. It is clear that a dianion equivalent from dihalomethane is generated and is actively involved in the reaction as demonstrated by initial trapping studies and later findings regarding the effect of lead catalyst on rate. Two main pathways have been proposed, with slightly different modes of activity for methylenation. The first is the addition of dianion equivalent into the carbonyl species in question, followed by complexation of Lewis acid and eventual elimination of the activated alkoxide by the remaining anion. The second involves the transmetalation of the dianion equivalent to form a titanium alkylidene, similar to those found in the Tebbe and Petasis methylenations, which would operate similarly. Most recently, a 2021 article from Takai elucidated the structure of a dinuclear titanium III complex with bridging methylene, which was capable of methylenation of an ester to vinyl ether.

== Applications ==
Application of the Lombardo conditions of the Takai-Oshima-Lombardo methylenation allow for methylenation of alpha-chiral ketones without perturbation of stereochemistry.

The Takai-Oshima-Lombardo reaction has been utilized in a variety of settings in total synthesis as well as other studies.

In Lombardo's 1982 correspondence, the transformation was utilized as a mild way to methylenate the C1 ketone without epimerization of C8a or base-catalyzed rearrangement which the gibberellin scaffold was known to be susceptible to.

Following this report, an Org Syn procedure was published by Lombardo in 1987 on the (+)-isomenthone scaffold, further demonstrating the ability of this reaction to proceed without ablation of stereochemistry at acidic C-H positions.

The DuBois Group leveraged the Takai-Oshima-Lombardo methylenation on an intermediate alpha-chiral ketone in their pursuit of (-)-tetrodotoxin with decent yield and no loss of stereochemical information.

More recently in 2003, this reaction was leveraged by DuBois to methylenate a cyclic ketone intermediate containing an alpha-chiral amide on route to (-)-tetrodotoxin. The highly-oxygenated intermediate was able to undergo the transformation without ablation of stereochemistry in a decent 72% yield.

The Marsden group applied the Takai-Oshima-Lombardo methylenation to silyl ketenes to afford allenylsilane compounds.

In 2005, Marsden utilized the Takai-Oshima-Lombardo reaction as a method to access allenylsilanes through methylenation of silyl ketenes generated by Wolff rearrangement of the corresponding alpha-silyl alpha-diazo ketones. Initial studies of this transformation using the corresponding Wittig reagents were unsuccessful, but the use of Lombardo's conditions was able to provide the desired compounds in 24% yield, then elaborated upon by use of Petasis methylenation to achieve higher yields.
