= René Peters (chemist) =

German chemist

René Peters (born August 26, 1971, in Simmerath) is a German chemist and since 2008 Professor of Organic Chemistry at the University of Stuttgart.

== Life and work ==
Peters studied chemistry at RWTH Aachen University from 1992 to 1997 and subsequently received his doctorate under Dieter Enders until 2000. This was followed by a stay as a postdoc at Harvard University with Yoshito Kishi as a DAAD scholarship holder. Between 2001 and 2004 he worked as a process research chemist at F. Hoffmann-La Roche LTD (Basel). From 2004 to 2008, Peters was an assistant professor at ETH Zurich. Since 2008 he has been Professor of Organic Chemistry at the University of Stuttgart.

The research team led by Prof. Peters is one of the leading groups in the field of cooperative asymmetric catalysis. The research is centered around the development of bi- and polyfunctional catalysts whose mode of action is inspired by enzymes, although the structure of the artificial catalysts is much simpler than those of enzymes. In the Peters catalysts, a Lewis acid often cooperates with charged, non-metallic functionalities such as ammonium, pyridinium or olium salts, betaine units and classical hydrogen bond donors. Through the different catalyst functional groups, simultaneous activation and a precise spatial alignment of both reactants is often possible, so that high catalytic activity can be combined with very high stereocontrol. In addition to the development of catalysts for asymmetric catalysis, the Peters research group investigates their mechanistic mode of action in an interdisciplinary approach.

The research group is also known for its development of planar chiral metallacycles, in which an intramolecular cooperation of two metal centers could often be used.
