= Halichondrin B =

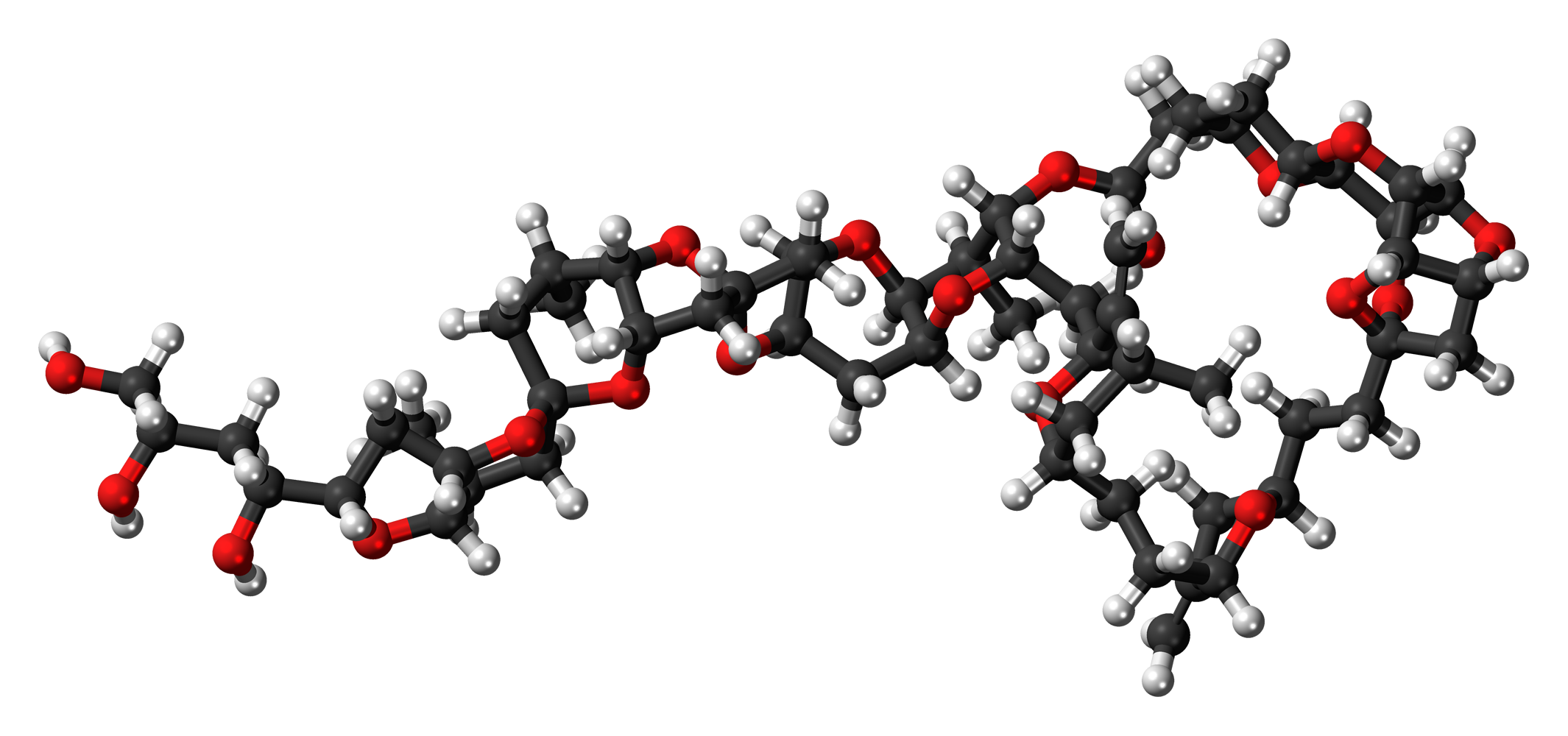

Names
- IUPAC name (1S,2S,2′S,3S,3aS,3a′S,5R,6S,7S,7′S,7aS,7a′S,9S,12S,14R,16R,18S,20S,22R,26R,28S,29S,30R,34R,37S,39R,40S,41R,43R,44S)-7,7′,14′′,29′′-tetramethyl-8′′,15′′-dimethylidene-2-(1,3,4-trihydroxybutyl)decahydro-3′H,32′′H-dispiro[furo[3,2-b]pyran-5,5′-furo[3,2-b]pyran-2′,24′′-[2,19,23,27,31,38,42,45,47,48,49]undecaoxaundecacyclo[32.9.2.1~3,40~.1~3,41~.1~6,9~.1~12,16 ~.0~18,30~.0~20,28~.0~22,26~.0~37,44~.0~39,43~]nonatetracontan]-32′′-one

Identifiers
CAS Number	103614-76-2
3D model (JSmol)	Interactive image
ChEMBL	ChEMBL387466
ChemSpider	10256208
PubChem CID	5488895
UNII	269R6PFM59
CompTox Dashboard (EPA)	DTXSID901028555
- InChI: InChI=1S/C60H86O19/c1-26-13-33-7-9-37-27(2)14-35(65-37)11-12-58-23-46-54(78-58)55-56(72-46)57(79-58)53-38(69-55)10-8-34(67-53)16-48(64)73-52-31(6)51-43(68-42(52)17-39(66-33)30(26)5)19-41-45(71-51)22-60(74-41)24-47-50(77-60)29(4)21-59(76-47)20-28(3)49-44(75-59)18-40(70-49)36(63)15-32(62)25-61/h26,28-29,31-47,49-57,61-63H,2,5,7-25H2,1,3-4,6H3/t26-,28+,29+,31+,32?,33+,34-,35+,36?,37+,38+,39-,40+,41-,42+,43+,44+,45-,46-,47+,49+,50+,51+,52-,53+,54+,55+,56-,57+,58+,59-,60+/m1/s1 Key: FXNFULJVOQMBCW-CGIYHSFGSA-N; InChI=1S/C60H86O19/c1-26-13-33-7-9-37-27(2)14-35(65-37)11-12-58-23-46-54(78-58)55-56(72-46)57(79-58)53-38(69-55)10-8-34(67-53)16-48(64)73-52-31(6)51-43(68-42(52)17-39(66-33)30(26)5)19-41-45(71-51)22-60(74-41)24-47-50(77-60)29(4)21-59(76-47)20-28(3)49-44(75-59)18-40(70-49)36(63)15-32(62)25-61/h26,28-29,31-47,49-57,61-63H,2,5,7-25H2,1,3-4,6H3/t26-,28+,29+,31+,32?,33+,34-,35+,36,37+,38+,39-,40+,41-,42+,43+,44+,45-,46-,47+,49+,50+,51+,52-,53+,54+,55+,56-,57+,58+,59-,60+/m1/s1; InChI=1S/C60H86O19/c1-26-13-33-7-9-37-27(2)14-35(65-37)11-12-58-23-46-54(78-58)55-56(72-46)57(79-58)53-38(69-55)10-8-34(67-53)16-48(64)73-52-31(6)51-43(68-42(52)17-39(66-33)30(26)5)19-41-45(71-51)22-60(74-41)24-47-50(77-60)29(4)21-59(76-47)20-28(3)49-44(75-59)18-40(70-49)36(63)15-32(62)25-61/h26,28-29,31-47,49-57,61-63H,2,5,7-25H2,1,3-4,6H3/t26-,28+,29+,31+,32?,33+,34-,35+,36?,37+,38+,39-,40+,41-,42+,43+,44+,45-,46-,47+,49+,50+,51+,52-,53+,54+,55+,56-,57+,58+,59-,60+/m1/s1 Key: FXNFULJVOQMBCW-CGIYHSFGSA-N
- SMILES: OCC(O)CC(O)[C@@H]1C[C@@H]2O[C@@]3(C[C@H](C)[C@@H]2O1)C[C@H](C)[C@@H]4O[C@]%10(C[C@@H]4O3)C[C@H]%11O[C@H]%12[C@H](C)[C@H]%13OC(=O)C[C@H]8CC[C@@H]9O[C@H]7[C@H]6O[C@]5(O[C@H]([C@@H]7O[C@@H]6C5)[C@H]9O8)CC[C@H]%15C/C(=C)[C@H](CC[C@H]%14C[C@@H](C)\C(=C)[C@@H](C[C@@H]%13O[C@H]%12C[C@H]%11O%10)O%14)O%15

Properties
Chemical formula	C_{60}H_{86}O_{19}
Molar mass	1111.329 g·mol^{−1}
- Except where otherwise noted, data are given for materials in their standard state (at 25 °C [77 °F], 100 kPa). verify (what is ?) Infobox references

Halichondrin B is a polyether macrolide originally isolated from the marine sponge Halichondria okadai by Hirata and Uemura in 1986. In that report, the authors described the purification, chemical structure and exquisite anticancer activity of halichondrin B against murine cancer cells in vitro and murine tumor models in vivo. Shortly thereafter, the Developmental Therapeutics Program (DTP) at the U.S. National Cancer Institute (NCI) designated halichondrin B a high priority for development as a novel anticancer drug. In 1991, halichondrin B was the original test case for identification of mechanism of action (in this case, tubulin-targeted mitotic inhibitor) by NCI's then-brand-new 60-cell line screen. In 1992, it was discovered that halichondrin B's anticancer activity resided in its so-called "Right Half" macrocyclic lactone moiety (C1-C38), which represents about 2/3 of the size of the full halichondrin B molecule.

== Chemical synthesis ==
The complete chemical synthesis of halichondrin B was achieved by Yoshito Kishi and colleagues at Harvard University in 1992, an achievement that enabled discovery and development of the structurally simplified, pharmaceutically optimized analog eribulin (previously, B1939, ER-086526, E7389, NSC-707389). Eribulin is approved in the U.S., EU, Japan, Canada and other jurisdictions for treatment of certain patients with breast cancer or liposarcoma, and is marketed by Eisai under the tradename Halaven.

More recently, a "full-sized" halichondrin analog, E7130, was synthesized under collaborative efforts between the Kishi group at Harvard and chemists at Eisai's Tsukuba Research Laboratories (Tsukuba, Japan). E7130 entered clinical trials for cancer in Japan (NCT03444701). Prior to his death in 2023, Kishi had developed a deep interest in the chemical nature and biological activities of the so-called "Left Half" of the halichondrins. Sadly, none of his extensive work in this area had reached publication at the time of his death.

== Biosynthesis ==
While a producer organism for halichondrin B has never been isolated in pure culture, the structural features of halichondrin B, such as the 'odd-even' rule of methylation, and the abundance of oxygen heterocycles, suggest it is a product of dinoflagellate polyether metabolism In support of this conjecture, the known dinoflagellate toxin okadaic acid was isolated from the same species of sponge. Yet, halichondrin B is not found in the geographically and relatively phylogenetically close sponges H. panicea or H. japonica which are found in similar tide pools in Japan as Halichondria okadai. In constrast, halichondrins have been reported from geographically and phylogenetically distant sponges to Halichondria okadai, including Axinella sp., Phakellia carteri, and Lissodendoryx. Aquaculture of the New Zealand sponge Lissodendoryx n. sp. 1 over at least 7 years, distant from its original range (at ~10 m depth near Wellington versus its native range ~90 m deep off the Kaikōura Peninsula), established it could produce halichondrin B at a relatively high yield over a time course of years, suggesting that halichondrins were being produced by vertically inherited symbionts, rather than being concentrated from a dietary source present in the environment. In fact, the bulk of halichondrin B used by the U.S. NCI for its therapeutic evaluation, was isolated from New Zealand Lissodendoryx rather than from Halichondria okadai.

== See also ==
- Altohyrtin A
