= Takai olefination =

Reaction in organic chemistry

Named after	Kazuhiko Takai
Reaction type	Carbon-carbon bond forming reaction

Takai olefination in organic chemistry describes the organic reaction of an aldehyde with a diorganochromium compound to form an alkene. It is a name reaction, named for Kazuhiko Takai, who first reported it in 1986. In the original reaction, the organochromium species is generated from iodoform or bromoform and an excess of chromium(II) chloride and the product is a vinyl halide. One main advantage of this reaction is the E-configuration of the double bond that is formed. According to the original report, existing alternatives such as the Wittig reaction only gave mixtures.

In the reaction mechanism proposed by Takai, chromium(II) is oxidized to chromium(III) eliminating two equivalents of a halide. The geminal carbodianion complex thus formed (determined as [Cr_{2}Cl_{4}(CHI)(THF)_{4}]) reacts with the aldehyde in a 1,2-addition along one of the carbon to chromium bonds and in the next step both chromium bearing groups engage in an elimination reaction. In Newman projection it can be seen how the steric bulks of chromium groups and the steric bulks of the alkyl and halogen groups drive this reaction towards anti elimination.

== History ==
Prior to the introduction of this chromium-based protocol, olefination reactions generally gave Z alkenes or mixtures of isomers. Similar olefination reactions had been performed using a variety of reagents such as zinc and lead chloride; however, these olefination reactions often lead to the formation of diols—the McMurry reaction—rather than the methylenation or alkylidenation of aldehydes. To circumvent this issue, the Takai group examined the synthetic potential of chromium(II) salts.

The reaction primarily employs the use of aldehydes, but ketones may be used. However, ketones do not react as well as aldehydes; thus, for a compound with both aldehyde and ketone groups, the reaction can target just the aldehyde group and leave the ketone group intact.

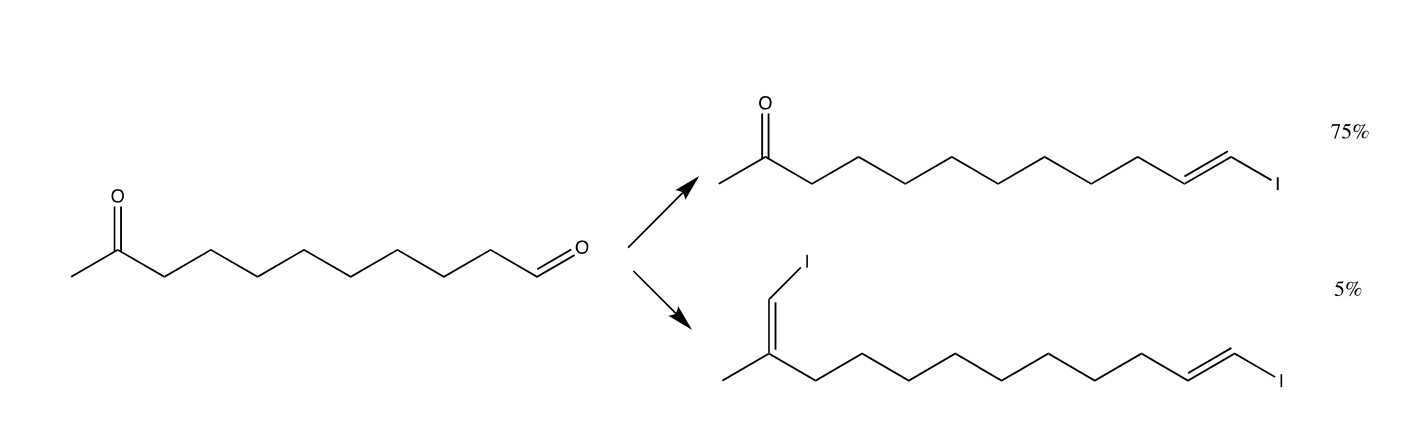
aldehyde specificity

The drawbacks to the reaction include the fact that stoichiometrically, four equivalents of chromium chloride must be used, since there is a reduction of two halogen atoms. Ways to limit the amount of chromium chloride exist, namely by utilization of zinc equivalent, but this method remains unpopular.

== Takai–Utimoto olefination ==
In a second publication the scope of the reaction was extended to diorganochromium intermediates bearing alkyl groups instead of halogens:
