= Allyl iodide =

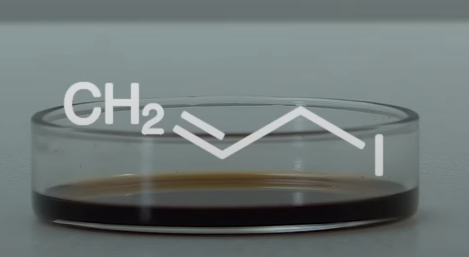

Names
- Preferred IUPAC name 3-Iodoprop-1-ene
- Other names Allyl iodide 3-Iodopropene; 3-Iodopropylene; 3-Iodo-1-propene; Iodoallylene; 2-Propenyl iodide

Identifiers
CAS Number	556-56-9
3D model (JSmol)	Interactive image; Interactive image
ChemSpider	21171407
ECHA InfoCard	100.008.302
EC Number	209-130-4
PubChem CID	11166
UNII	46830QOA4D
UN number	1723
CompTox Dashboard (EPA)	DTXSID5060302
- InChI: InChI=1S/C3H5I/c1-2-3-4/h2H,1,3H2 Key: BHELZAPQIKSEDF-UHFFFAOYSA-N; InChI=1/C3H5I/c1-2-3-4/h2H,1,3H2
- SMILES: ICC=C; C=CCI

Properties
Chemical formula	C_{3}H_{5}I
Molar mass	167.977 g·mol^{−1}
Appearance	Pale yellow liquid
Density	1.837 g/cm^{3}
Melting point	−99 °C (−146 °F; 174 K)
Boiling point	101 to 103 °C (214 to 217 °F; 374 to 376 K)

Hazards
- GHS labelling
Pictograms	(GHS02: Flammable) (GHS05: Corrosive)
Signal word	Danger
Hazard statements	H225, H314
Precautionary statements	P210, P233, P240, P241, P242, P243, P260, P264, P280, P301+P330+P331, P303+P361+P353, P304+P340, P305+P351+P338, P310, P321, P363, P370+P378, P403+P235, P405, P501
Flash point	18 °C (64 °F; 291 K)
Safety data sheet (SDS)	MSDS at Sigma Aldrich
- Except where otherwise noted, data are given for materials in their standard state (at 25 °C [77 °F], 100 kPa). Infobox references

Allyl iodide (3-iodopropene) is an organic halide used in synthesis of other organic compounds such as N-alkyl-2-pyrrolidones, sorbic acid esters, 5,5-disubstituted barbituric acids, and organometallic catalysts. Allyl iodide can be synthesized from allyl alcohol and methyl iodide on triphenyl phosphite, Finkelstein reaction on allyl halides, or by the action of elemental phosphorus and iodine on glycerol. Allyl iodide dissolved in hexane can be stored for up to three months in a dark freezer at −5 °C (23 °F) before decomposition into free iodine becomes apparent.

== See also ==
- Allyl
- Allyl alcohol
- Allyl bromide
- Allyl chloride
