= Allyl bromide =

- Skeletal formula

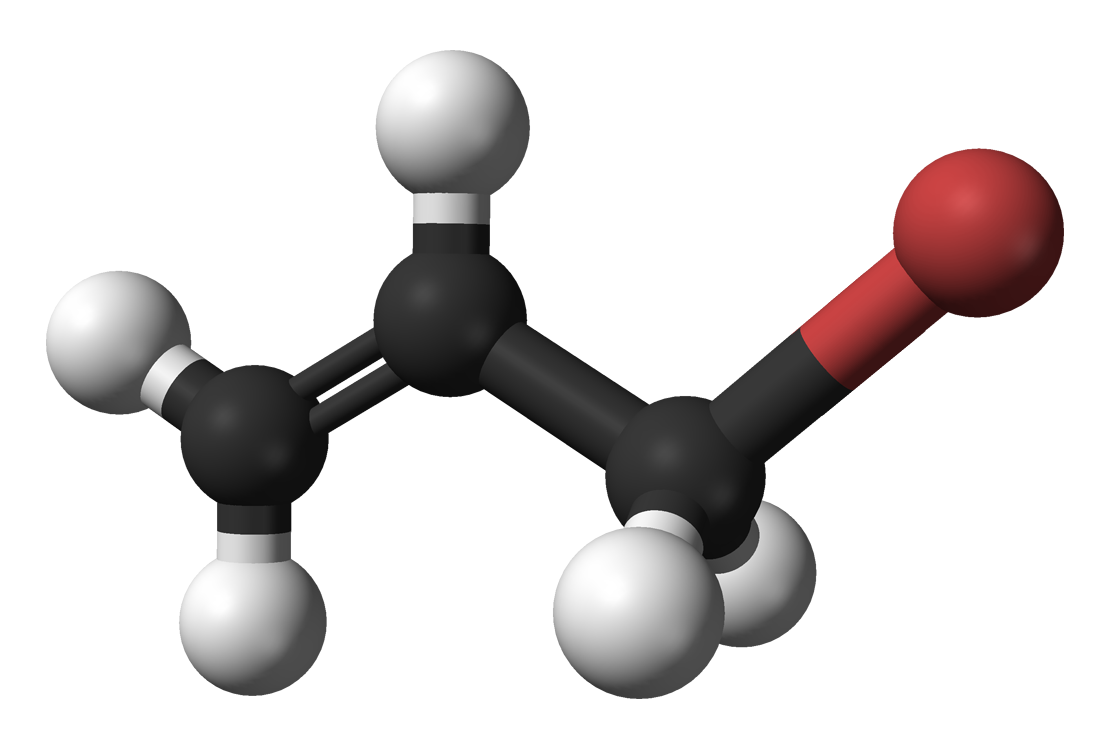
- Ball-and-stick model

Names
- Preferred IUPAC name 3-Bromoprop-1-ene
- Other names Allyl bromide 3-Bromopropene; 3-Bromopropylene; 3-Bromo-1-propene; Bromoallylene; 2-Propenyl bromide

Identifiers
CAS Number	106-95-6
3D model (JSmol)	Interactive image; Interactive image
ChemSpider	7553
ECHA InfoCard	100.003.134
EC Number	203-446-6
PubChem CID	7841
RTECS number	UC7090000
UNII	FXQ8X2F74Z
UN number	1099
CompTox Dashboard (EPA)	DTXSID8024442
- InChI: InChI=1S/C3H5Br/c1-2-3-4/h2H,1,3H2 Key: BHELZAPQIKSEDF-UHFFFAOYSA-N; InChI=1/C3H5Br/c1-2-3-4/h2H,1,3H2 Key: BHELZAPQIKSEDF-UHFFFAOYAI
- SMILES: BrCC=C; C=CCBr

Properties
Chemical formula	C_{3}H_{5}Br
Molar mass	120.977 g·mol^{−1}
Appearance	Clear to light yellow liquid
Odor	Unpleasant, irritating, pungent
Density	1.398 g/cm^{3}
Melting point	−119 °C (−182 °F; 154 K)
Boiling point	71 °C (160 °F; 344 K)
Solubility in water	0.38 g/100 g H_{2}O
log P	1.79
Vapor pressure	18.6 kPa
Magnetic susceptibility (χ)	−58.6·10^{−6} cm^{3}·mol^{−1}
Refractive index (n_{D})	1.4697 (20 °C, 589.2 nm)
Viscosity	0.471 cP
Dipole moment	≈1.9 D

Thermochemistry
Std enthalpy of formation (Δ_{f}H^{⦵}_{298})	12.2 kJ·mol^{−1} (liquid); 45.2 kJ·mol^{−1} (gas)
Enthalpy of vaporization (Δ_{f}H_{vap})	32.73 kJ·mol^{−1}

Hazards
- GHS labelling
Pictograms	(GHS02: Flammable) (GHS05: Corrosive) (GHS06: Toxic) (GHS08: Health hazard) (GHS09: Environmental hazard)
Signal word	Danger
Hazard statements	H225, H301, H314, H330, H331, H340, H350, H400
Precautionary statements	P201, P202, P210, P233, P240, P241, P242, P243, P260, P264, P270, P271, P273, P280, P281, P284, P301+P310, P301+P330+P331, P303+P361+P353, P304+P340, P305+P351+P338, P308+P313, P310, P311, P320, P321, P330, P363, P370+P378, P391, P403+P233, P403+P235, P405, P501
NFPA 704 (fire diamond)	3 3 1
Flash point	−2 to −1 °C
Autoignition temperature	280 °C (536 °F; 553 K)
Explosive limits	4.3–7.3 %
Threshold limit value (TLV)	0.1 ppm (TWA), 0.2 ppm (STEL)
Safety data sheet (SDS)	MSDS at Oxford University

Related compounds
Related compounds	Allyl chloride Allyl iodide
- Except where otherwise noted, data are given for materials in their standard state (at 25 °C [77 °F], 100 kPa). verify (what is ?) Infobox references

Allyl bromide (3-bromopropene) is an organic halide. It is an alkylating agent used in synthesis of polymers, pharmaceuticals, perfumes and other organic compounds. Allyl bromide is a colorless liquid, although commercial samples appear yellow or brown. It is an irritant and a potentially dangerous alkylating agent. Allyl bromide is more reactive but more expensive than allyl chloride, and these considerations guide its use.

== Preparation ==
=== Hydrohalogenation ===
Allyl bromide is produced commercially from allyl alcohol and hydrobromic acid:

CH_{2}=CHCH_{2}OH + HBr → CH_{2}=CHCH_{2}Br + H_{2}O

It can also be prepared by the halogen-exchange reaction between allyl chloride and hydrobromic acid or by the allylic bromination of propene.

== Reactions and uses ==
Allyl bromide is an electrophilic alkylating agent. It reacts with nucleophiles, such as amines, carbanions, alkoxides, etc., to introduce the allyl group:

CH_{2}=CHCH_{2}Br + Nu^{−} → CH_{2}=CHCH_{2}Nu + Br^{−} (Nu^{−} is a nucleophile)

It is used in the synthesis of compounds containing the allyl functionality, such as the pharmaceuticals methohexital, secobarbital and thiamylal.

Allyl bromide reacts with magnesium metal in dry ether to form allylmagnesium bromide, a Grignard reagent:

CH_{2}=CHCH_{2}Br + Mg → CH_{2}=CHCH_{2}MgBr
