= Vinyl halide =

Class of chemical compounds

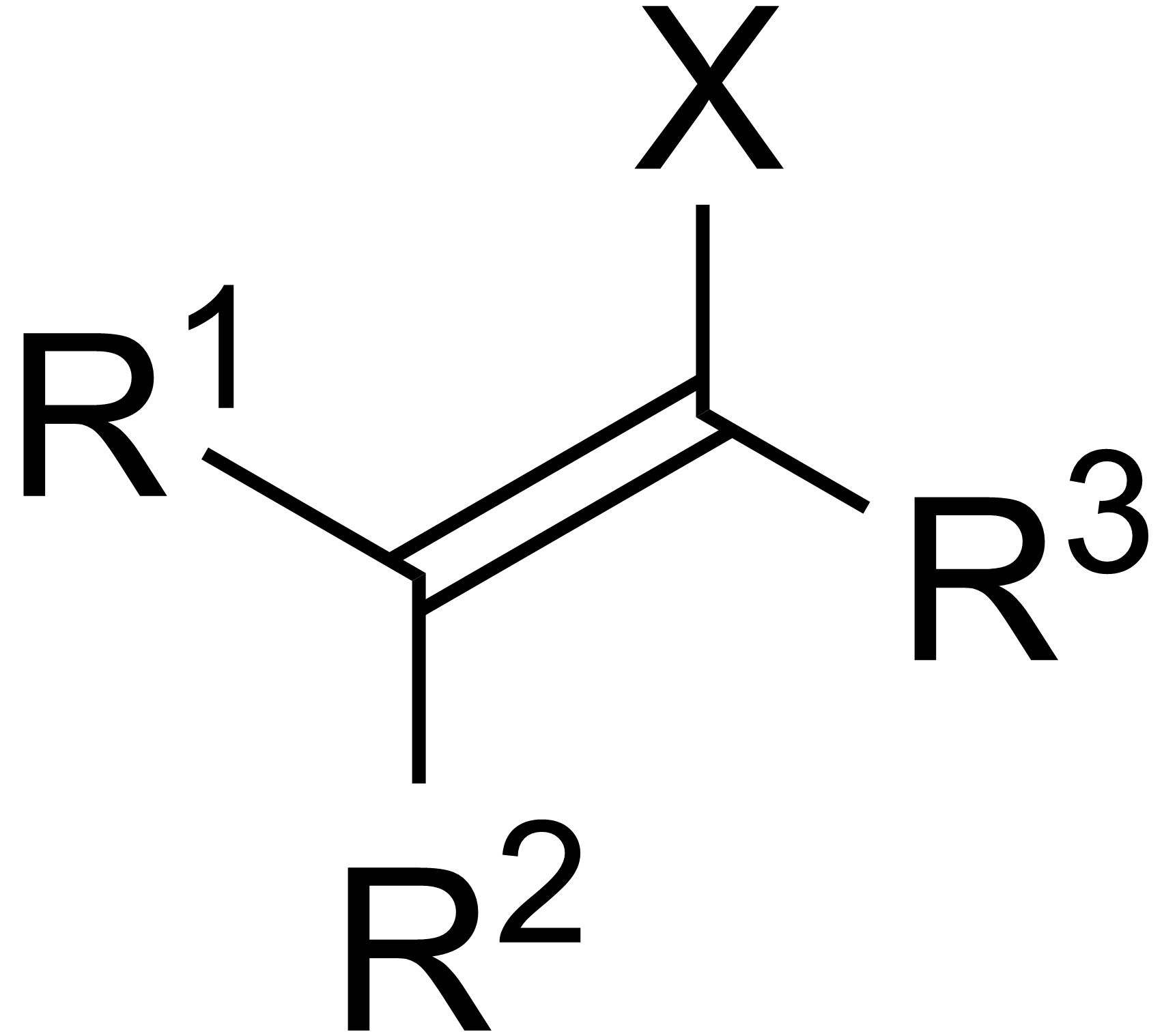
General structure of a vinyl halide, where X is a halogen and R is a variable group.

In organic chemistry, a vinyl halide is a compound with the formula CH_{2}=CHX (X = halide). The term vinyl is often used to describe any alkenyl group. For this reason, alkenyl halides with the formula RCH=CHX are sometimes called vinyl halides. From the perspective of applications, the dominant member of this class of compounds is vinyl chloride, which is produced on the scale of millions of tons per year as a precursor to polyvinyl chloride. Polyvinyl fluoride is another commercial product. Related compounds include vinylidene chloride and vinylidene fluoride.

== Synthesis ==
Vinyl chloride is produced by dehydrochlorination of 1,2-dichloroethane.

Due to their high utility, many approaches to vinyl halides have been developed, such as:

- reactions of vinyl organometallic species with halogens

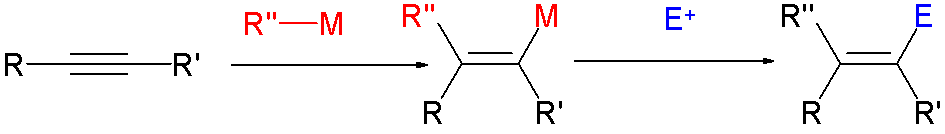

- Takai olefination

- Stork-Zhao olefination with, e.g., (Chloromethylene)triphenylphosphorane - a modification of the Wittig reaction

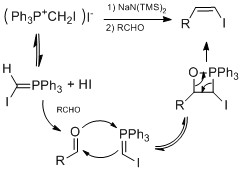

- Olefin metathesis

== Reactions ==
Vinyl bromide and related alkenyl halides form the Grignard reagent and related organolithium reagents. Alkenyl halides undergo base elimination to give the corresponding alkyne. Most important is their use in cross-coupling reactions (e.g. Suzuki-Miyaura coupling, Stille coupling, Heck coupling, etc.).

== See also ==
- Vinyl iodide functional group
