= Yoshito Kishi =

Japanese chemistry professor (1937–2023)

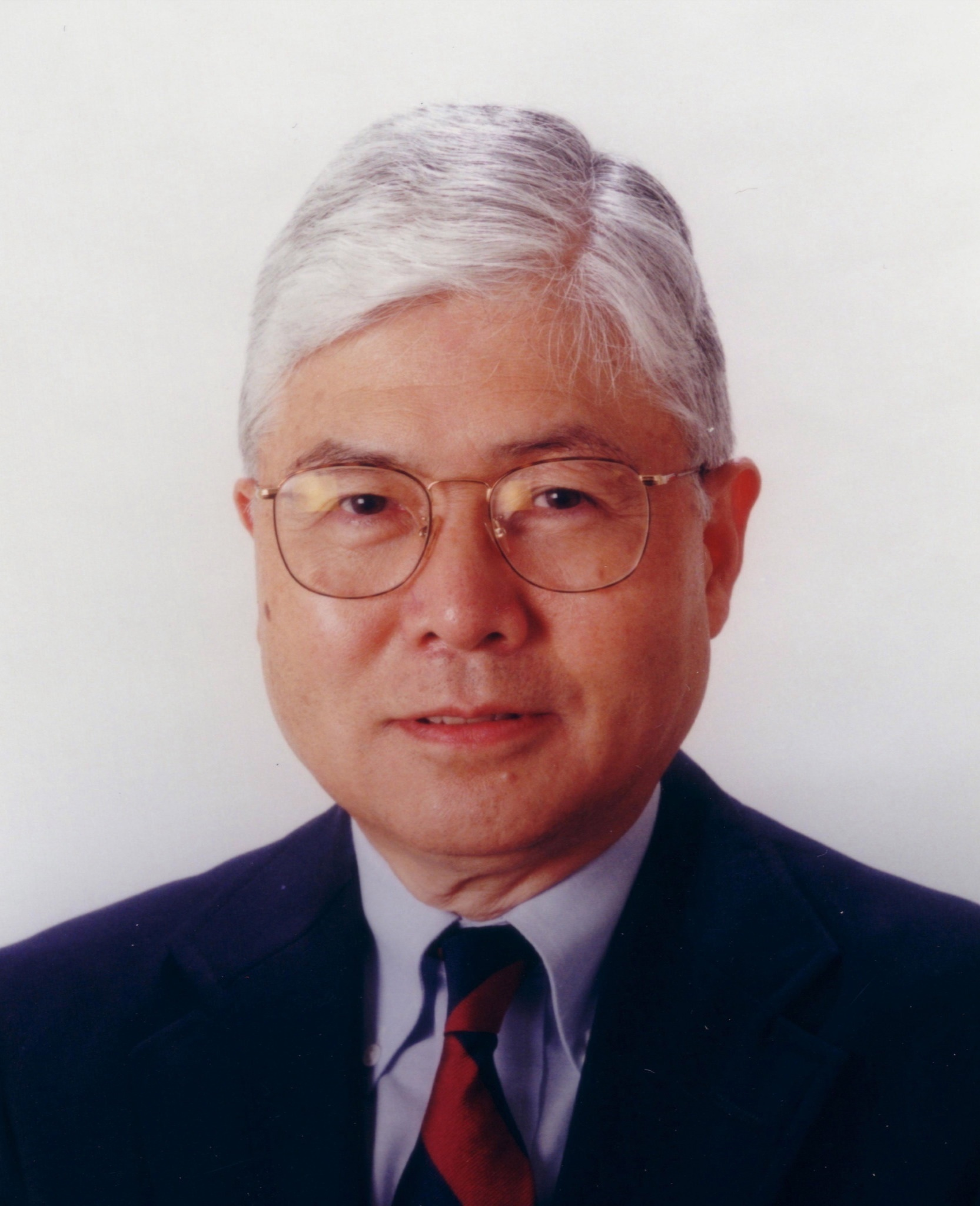
- Kishi in 2003
- Born: 13 April 1937; Nagoya, Japan
- Died: 9 January 2023 (aged 85)
- Education: Nagoya University (BS, PhD)
- Scientific career
- Fields: Organic chemistry
- Workplaces: Nagoya University; Harvard University
- Thesis: ウミホタルルシフェリンの構造とその全合成 (1966)
- Doctoral advisor: Yoshimasa Hirata
- Doctoral students: Tohru Fukuyama; Stuart L. Schreiber
- Other notable students: René Peters (chemist)

Yoshito Kishi (岸 義人, Kishi Yoshito; 13 April 1937 – 9 January 2023) was a Japanese chemist who was the Morris Loeb Professor of Chemistry at Harvard University. He was known for his contributions to the sciences of organic synthesis and total synthesis.

== Early life and education ==
Kishi was born in Nagoya, Japan and attended Nagoya University, where he obtained both his BS and PhD degrees. He was a postdoctoral research fellow at Harvard University where he worked with Robert Burns Woodward. From 1966 through 1974, he was a professor of chemistry at Nagoya University. In 1974, Kishi joined the faculty of Harvard's Department of Chemistry, where he rose through the academic ranks to ultimately become Morris Loeb Professor of Chemistry, a position he held until his death in 2023.

Kishi's research focused on the total synthesis of complex natural products. The accomplishments of his research group include the total syntheses of palytoxin, mycolactones, halichondrins, saxitoxin, tetrodotoxin, geldanamycin, batrachotoxin and many others. Kishi also contributed to the development of new chemical reactions including the Nozaki–Hiyama–Kishi reaction. Kishi's total synthesis of halichondrin B was pivotal for the discovery and development of the anticancer drug eribulin, a fully synthetic, pharmaceutically optimized macrocyclic ketone analog of halichondrin B.

== Recognition ==
- 1999 Imperial Prize of the Japan Academy
- 2001 Tetrahedron Prize for Creativity in Organic Chemistry & BioMedicinal Chemistry
- 2001 Ernest Guenther Award
- 2001 Person of Cultural Merit
- 2013 Order of the Sacred Treasure
- 2018 Ryoji Noyori Prize

== See also ==
- Hitoshi Nozaki
