= Allyl chloride =

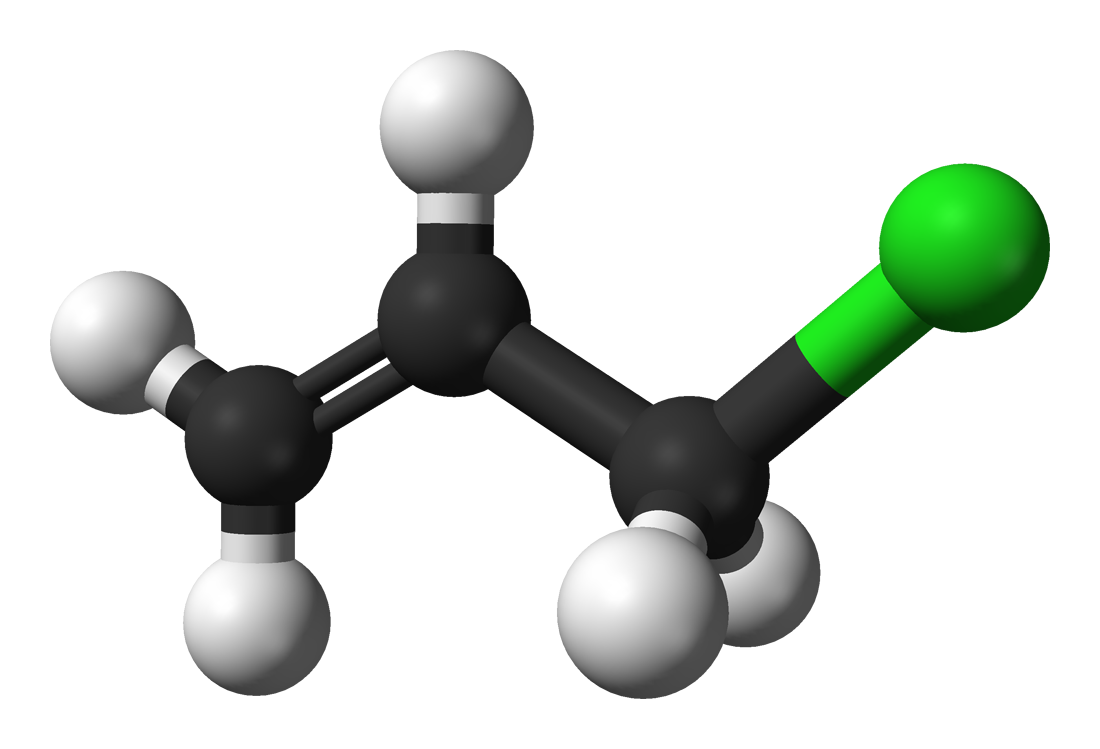

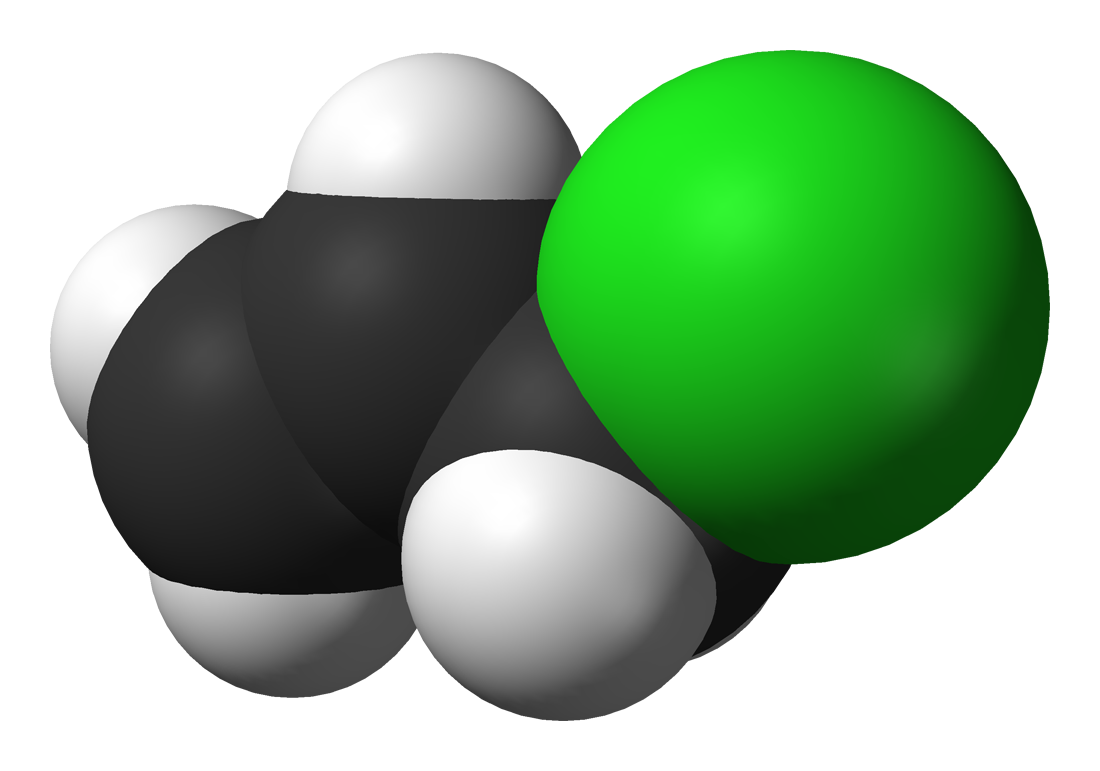

Names
- Preferred IUPAC name 3-Chloroprop-1-ene
- Other names 3-Chloropropene; 1-Chloro-2-propene; 3-Chloropropylene

Identifiers
| CAS Number | 107-05-1 |
| 3D model (JSmol) | Interactive image |
| ChEBI | CHEBI:82379 |
| ChEMBL | ChEMBL451126 |
| ChemSpider | 13836674 |
| ECHA InfoCard | 100.003.144 |
| EC Number | 209-675-8 |
| KEGG | C19316 |
| PubChem CID | 7850 |
| RTECS number | UC7350000 |
| UNII | V2RFT0R50S |
| UN number | 1100 |
| CompTox Dashboard (EPA) | DTXSID4039231 |
- InChI: InChI=1S/C3H5Cl/c1-2-3-4/h2H,1,3H2 Key: OSDWBNJEKMUWAV-UHFFFAOYSA-N; InChI=1/C3H5Cl/c1-2-3-4/h2H,1,3H2 Key: OSDWBNJEKMUWAV-UHFFFAOYAQ
- SMILES: C=CCCl

Properties
| Chemical formula | C_{3}H_{5}Cl |
| Molar mass | 76.52 g·mol^{−1} |
| Appearance | Colorless, brown, yellow, or purple liquid |
| Odor | pungent, unpleasant |
| Density | 0.94 g/mL |
| Melting point | −135 °C (−211 °F; 138 K) |
| Boiling point | 45 °C (113 °F; 318 K) |
| Solubility in water | 0.36 g/100 ml (20 °C) |
| Solubility | soluble in ether, acetone, benzene, chloroform |
| Vapor pressure | 295 mmHg |
| Refractive index (n_{D}) | 1.4055 |
| Viscosity | 0.3130 mPa·s |

Hazards
- GHS labelling
| Pictograms | (GHS02: Flammable) (GHS07: Exclamation mark) (GHS08: Health hazard) (GHS09: Environmental hazard) |
| Signal word | Danger |
| Hazard statements | H225, H302, H312, H315, H319, H332, H335, H341, H351, H373, H400 |
| Precautionary statements | P201, P202, P210, P233, P240, P241, P242, P243, P260, P264, P270, P271, P273, P280, P281, P301+P312, P302+P352, P303+P361+P353, P304+P312, P304+P340, P305+P351+P338, P308+P313, P312, P314, P321, P322, P330, P332+P313, P337+P313, P362, P363, P370+P378, P391, P403+P233, P403+P235, P405, P501 |
| NFPA 704 (fire diamond) | 3 3 1 |
| Flash point | −32 °C (−26 °F; 241 K) |
| Autoignition temperature | 390 °C (734 °F; 663 K) |
| Explosive limits | 2.9–11.2% |
- Lethal dose or concentration (LD, LC)
| LC_{50} (median concentration) | 11000 mg/m^{3} (rat, 2 hr); 11500 mg/m^{3} (mouse, 2 hr); 5800 mg/m^{3} (guinea pig, 2 hr); 22500 mg/m^{3} (rabbit, 2 hr); 10500 mg/m^{3} (cat, 2 hr) |
- NIOSH (US health exposure limits)
| PEL (Permissible) | TWA 1 ppm (3 mg/m^{3}) |
| REL (Recommended) | TWA 1 ppm (3 mg/m^{3}); ST 2 ppm (6 mg/m^{3}) |
| IDLH (Immediate danger) | 250 ppm |
- Except where otherwise noted, data are given for materials in their standard state (at 25 °C [77 °F], 100 kPa). verify (what is ?) Infobox references

Allyl chloride is the organic compound with the formula CH_{2}=CHCH_{2}Cl. This colorless liquid is insoluble in water but soluble in common organic solvents. It is mainly converted to epichlorohydrin, used in the production of plastics. It is a chlorinated derivative of propylene. It is an alkylating agent, which makes it both useful and hazardous to handle.

== Production ==
=== Laboratory scale ===
Allyl chloride was first produced in 1857 by Auguste Cahours and August Hofmann by reacting allyl alcohol with phosphorus trichloride. Modern preparation protocols economize this approach, replacing relatively expensive phosphorus trichloride with hydrochloric acid and a catalyst such as copper(I) chloride.

=== Industrial scale ===
Allyl chloride is produced by the chlorination of propylene. At lower temperatures, the main product is 1,2-dichloropropane, but at 500 °C, allyl chloride predominates, being formed via a free radical reaction:

CH_{3}CH=CH_{2} + Cl_{2} → ClCH_{2}CH=CH_{2} + HCl

An estimated 800,000 tonnes were produced this way in 1997.

== Reactions and uses ==
The great majority of allyl chloride is converted to epichlorohydrin. Other commercially significant derivatives include allyl alcohol, allylamine, allyl isothiocyanate (synthetic mustard oil), and 1-bromo-3-chloropropane.

As an alkylating agent, it is useful in the manufacture of pharmaceuticals and pesticides, such as mustard oil.

=== Illustrative reactions ===
Illustrative of its reactivity is its cyanation to allyl cyanide (CH_{2}=CHCH_{2}CN). Being a reactive alkyl halide, it undergoes reductive coupling to give diallyl:

2 ClCH_{2}CH=CH_{2} + Mg → (CH_{2})_{2}(CH=CH_{2})_{2} + MgCl_{2}

It undergoes oxidative addition to palladium(0) to give allylpalladium chloride dimer, (C_{3}H_{5})_{2}Pd_{2}Cl_{2}. Dehydrohalogenation gives cyclopropene.

== Safety ==
Allyl chloride is highly toxic and flammable. Eye effects may be delayed and may lead to possible impairment of vision.

== See also ==
- Allyl
- Allyl bromide
- Allyl iodide
