= Cross-coupling reaction =

Chemical reaction in which two molecules are joined due to a metal catalyst

In organic chemistry, a cross-coupling reaction is a reaction where two different fragments are joined. Cross-couplings are a subset of the more general coupling reactions. Often cross-coupling reactions require metal catalysts. One important reaction type is this:

$\ce{R-M + R'X -> R-R' + MX}$

R, R' = organic fragments, usually aryl;
M = main group center such as Li or Mg;
X = halide

These reactions are used to form carbon–carbon bonds but also carbon-heteroatom bonds.

Richard F. Heck, Ei-ichi Negishi, and Akira Suzuki were awarded the 2010 Nobel Prize in Chemistry for developing palladium-catalyzed coupling reactions.

== Mechanism ==
Many mechanisms exist reflecting the myriad types of cross-couplings, including those that do not require metal catalysts. Often, however, cross-coupling refers to a metal-catalyzed reaction of a nucleophilic partner with an electrophilic partner.

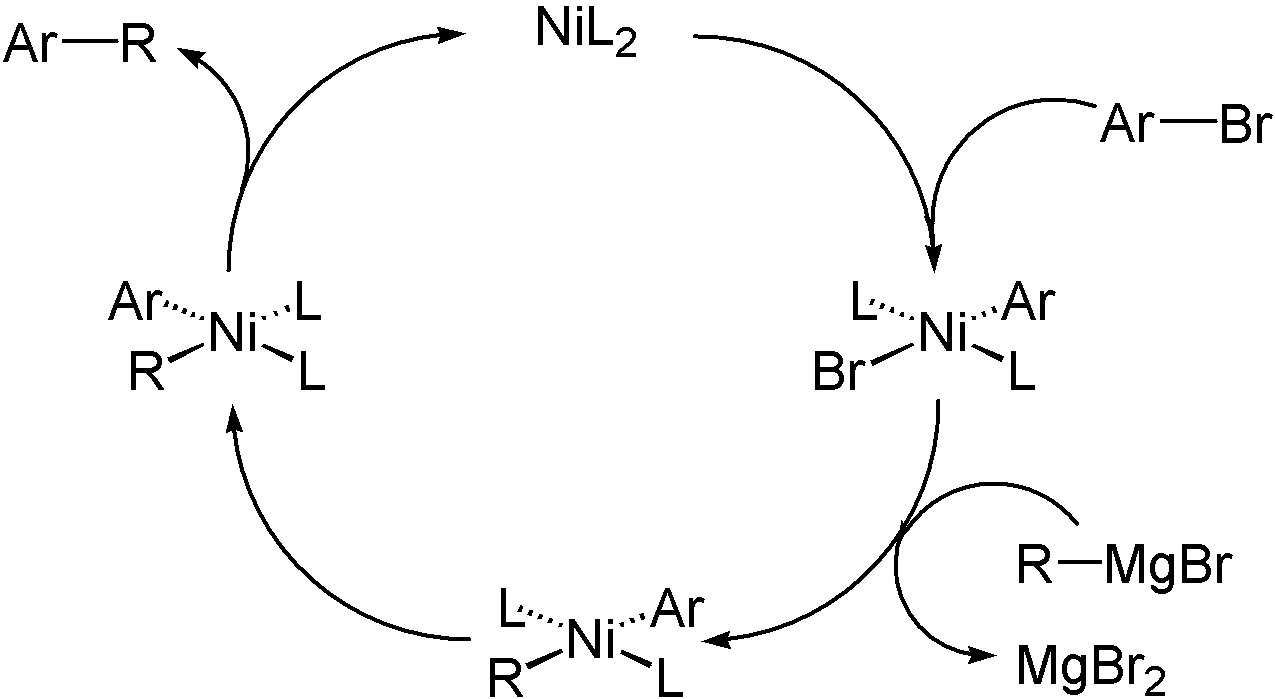
Mechanism proposed for Kumada coupling (L = Ligand, Ar = Aryl).

In such cases, the mechanism generally involves reductive elimination of R-R' from L_{n}MR(R') (L = spectator ligand). This intermediate L_{n}MR(R') is formed in a two-step process from a low valence precursor L_{n}M. The oxidative addition of an organic halide (RX) to L_{n}M gives L_{n}MR(X). Subsequently, the second partner undergoes transmetallation with a source of R'^{−}. The final step is reductive elimination of the two coupling fragments to regenerate the catalyst and give the organic product. Unsaturated substrates, such as C(sp)−X and C(sp^{2})−X bonds, couple more easily, in part because they add readily to the catalyst.

=== Catalysts ===
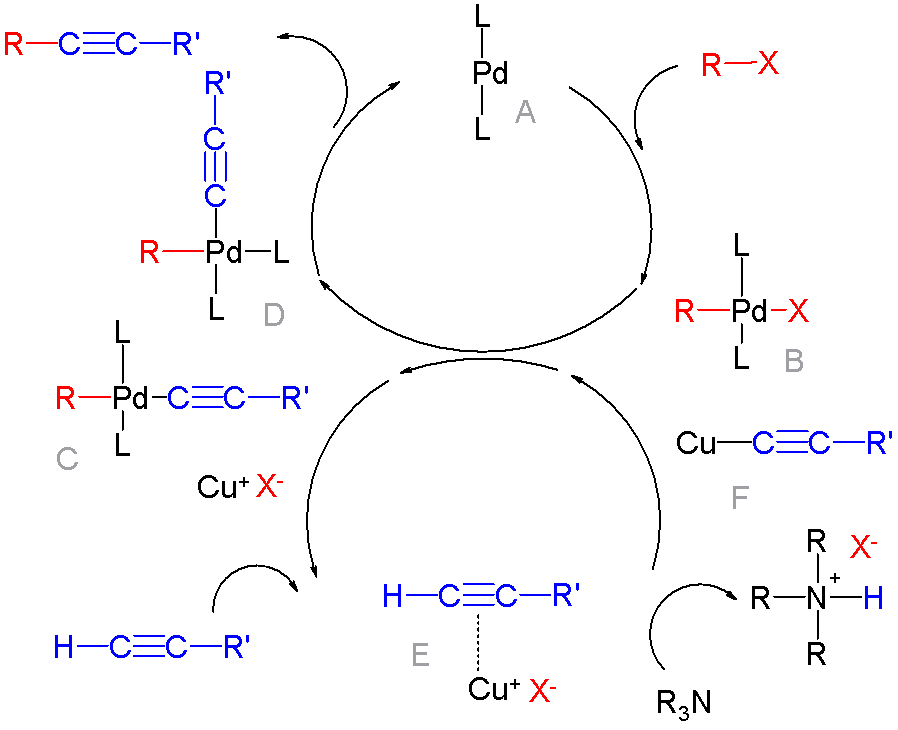
Mechanism proposed for the Sonogashira coupling.

Catalysts are often based on palladium, which is frequently selected due to high functional group tolerance. Organopalladium compounds are generally stable towards water and air. Palladium catalysts can be problematic for the pharmaceutical industry, which faces extensive regulation regarding heavy metals. Many pharmaceutical chemists attempt to use coupling reactions early in production to minimize metal traces in the product. Heterogeneous catalysts based on Pd are also well-developed.

Alternatives to palladium cross-couplings became prevalent in the 2000s, with interest in non-precious and less toxic metals. Copper-based catalysts are especially useful for coupling involving heteroatom-C bonds. Iron- and cobalt-catalysis have also been investigated. The use of nickel-based catalysis has become more widespread.

=== Leaving groups ===
The leaving group X in the organic partner is usually a halide, although triflate, tosylate, pivalate esters, carbamates, and other pseudohalides have been used. Chloride is an ideal group due to the low cost of organochlorine compounds. Frequently, however, C–Cl bonds are too inert, and bromide or iodide leaving groups are required for acceptable rates. The main group metal in the organometallic partner is usually an electropositive element such as tin, zinc, silicon, or boron.

== Carbon–carbon cross-coupling ==
Many cross-couplings entail forming carbon–carbon bonds.

| Reaction | Year | Reactant A | | Reactant B | | Catalyst | Remark |
|---|---|---|---|---|---|---|---|
| Cadiot–Chodkiewicz coupling | 1957 | RC≡CH | sp | RC≡CX | sp | Cu | requires base |
| Castro–Stephens coupling | 1963 | RC≡CH | sp | Ar-X | sp^{2} | Cu | |
| Corey–House synthesis | 1967 | R_{2}CuLi or RMgX | sp^{3} | R-X | sp^{2}, sp^{3} | Cu | Cu-catalyzed version by Kochi, 1971 |
| Kumada coupling | 1972 | RMgBr | sp^{2}, sp^{3} | R-X | sp^{2} | Pd or Ni or Fe | |
| Heck reaction | 1972 | alkene | sp^{2} | Ar-X | sp^{2} | Pd or Ni | requires base |
| Sonogashira coupling | 1975 | ArC≡CH | sp | R-X | sp^{3} sp^{2} | Pd and Cu | requires base |
| Negishi coupling | 1977 | R-Zn-X | sp^{3}, sp^{2}, sp | R-X | sp^{3} sp^{2} | Pd or Ni | |
| Stille cross coupling | 1978 | R-SnR_{3} | sp^{3}, sp^{2}, sp | R-X | sp^{3} sp^{2} | Pd or Ni | |
| Suzuki reaction | 1979 | R-B(OR)_{2} | sp^{2} | R-X | sp^{3} sp^{2} | Pd or Ni | requires base |
| Murahashi coupling | 1979 | R-Li | sp^{2}, sp^{3} | R-X | sp^{2} | Pd or Ru | |
| Hiyama coupling | 1988 | R-SiR_{3} | sp^{2} | R-X | sp^{3} sp^{2} | Pd | requires base |
| Fukuyama coupling | 1998 | R-Zn-I | sp^{3} | RCO(SEt) | sp^{2} | Pd or Ni | see Liebeskind–Srogl coupling, gives ketones |
| Liebeskind–Srogl coupling | 2000 | R-B(OR)_{2} | sp^{3}, sp^{2} | RCO(SEt) Ar-SMe | sp^{2} | Pd | requires CuTC, gives ketones |
| Cross dehydrogenative coupling | 2004 | R-H | sp, sp^{2}, sp^{3} | R'-H | sp, sp^{2}, sp^{3} | Cu, Fe, Pd etc. | requires oxidant or dehydrogenation |
| Decarboxylative cross-coupling | 2000s | R-CO_{2}H | sp^{2} | R'-X | sp, sp^{2} | Cu, Pd | Requires little-to-no base |

The restrictions on carbon atom geometry mainly inhibit β-hydride elimination when complexed to the catalyst.

== Carbon–heteroatom coupling ==
Many cross-couplings entail forming carbon–heteroatom bonds (heteroatom = S, N, O). A popular method is the Buchwald–Hartwig reaction:

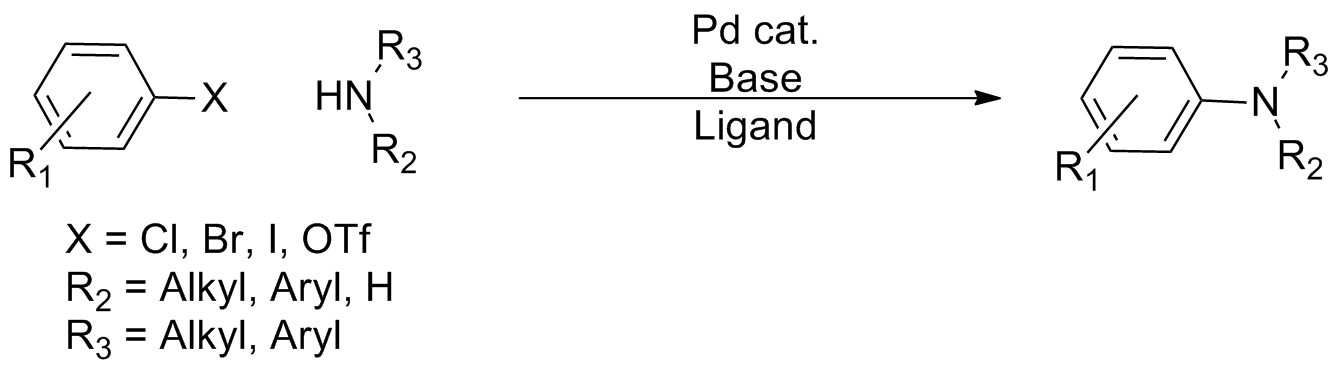
The Buchwald–Hartwig reaction

| Reaction | Year | Reactant A | | Reactant B | | Catalyst | Remark |
|---|---|---|---|---|---|---|---|
| Ullmann-type reaction | 1905 | ArO-MM, ArNH_{2}, RS-M, NC-M | sp^{3} | Ar-X (X = OAr, N(H)Ar, SR, CN) | sp^{2} | Cu | |
| Buchwald–Hartwig reaction | 1994 | R_{2}N-H | sp^{3} | R-X | sp^{2} | Pd | N-C coupling, second generation free amine |
| Chan–Lam coupling | 1998 | Ar-B(OR)_{2} | sp^{2} | Ar-NH_{2} | sp^{2} | Cu | |

== Miscellaneous reactions ==
Palladium catalyzes the cross-coupling of aryl halides with fluorinated arene. The process is unusual in that it involves C–H functionalisation at an electron deficient arene.

A new class of cross-couplings was discovered in 2015 by the research teams of Neil Garg and Ken Houk involving amides as coupling partners. Nickel catalysis breaks the typical strong C-N bonds of amides through oxidative addition. Using nickel or palladium, transformations of amides can be achieved, including esterification, transamidation, hydrolysis, Suzuki-Miyaura couplings, and asymmetric Heck reactions.

== Applications ==
Cross-coupling reactions are important for the production of pharmaceuticals, examples being montelukast, eletriptan, naproxen, varenicline, and resveratrol, with Suzuki coupling being most widely used. Some polymers and monomers are also prepared in this way.

== See also ==
- Cross electrophile coupling – Cross-coupling reaction between two electrophiles

== Reviews ==
- Fortman, George C.; Nolan, Steven P. (2011). "N-Heterocyclic carbene (NHC) ligands and palladium in homogeneous cross-coupling catalysis: a perfect union". Chemical Society Reviews. 40 (10): 5151–69. doi:10.1039/c1cs15088j. PMID 21731956.
- Yin; Liebscher, Jürgen (2007). "Carbon−Carbon Coupling Reactions Catalyzed by Heterogeneous Palladium Catalysts". Chemical Reviews. 107 (1): 133–173. Bibcode:2007ChRv..107..133Y. doi:10.1021/cr0505674. PMID 17212474. S2CID 36974481.
- Jana, Ranjan; Pathak, Tejas P.; Sigman, Matthew S. (2011). "Advances in Transition Metal (Pd,Ni,Fe)-Catalyzed Cross-Coupling Reactions Using Alkyl-organometallics as Reaction Partners". Chemical Reviews. 111 (3): 1417–1492. Bibcode:2011ChRv..111.1417J. doi:10.1021/cr100327p. PMC 3075866. PMID 21319862.
- Molnár, Árpád (2011). "Efficient, Selective, and Recyclable Palladium Catalysts in Carbon−Carbon Coupling Reactions". Chemical Reviews. 111 (3): 2251–2320. Bibcode:2011ChRv..111.2251M. doi:10.1021/cr100355b. PMID 21391571.
- Miyaura, Norio; Suzuki, Akira (1995). "Palladium-Catalyzed Cross-Coupling Reactions of Organoboron Compounds". Chemical Reviews. 95 (7): 2457–2483. CiteSeerX 10.1.1.735.7660. doi:10.1021/cr00039a007.
- Roglans, Anna; Pla-Quintana, Anna; Moreno-Mañas, Marcial (2006). "Diazonium Salts as Substrates in Palladium-Catalyzed Cross-Coupling Reactions". Chemical Reviews. 106 (11): 4622–4643. Bibcode:2006ChRv..106.4622R. doi:10.1021/cr0509861. PMID 17091930. S2CID 8128630.
- Korch, Katerina M.; Watson, Donald A. (2019). "Cross-Coupling of Heteroatomic Electrophiles". Chemical Reviews. 119 (13): 8192–8228. doi:10.1021/acs.chemrev.8b00628. PMC 6620169. PMID 31184483.
- Cahiez, Gérard; Moyeux, Alban (2010). "Cobalt-Catalyzed Cross-Coupling Reactions". Chemical Reviews. 110 (3): 1435–1462. doi:10.1021/cr9000786. PMID 20148539.
- Yi, Hong; Zhang, Guoting; Wang, Huamin; Huang, Zhiyuan; Wang, Jue; Singh, Atul K.; Lei, Aiwen (2017). "Recent Advances in Radical C–H Activation/Radical Cross-Coupling". Chemical Reviews. 117 (13): 9016–9085. Bibcode:2017ChRv..117.9016Y. doi:10.1021/acs.chemrev.6b00620. PMID 28639787.
