= Hantzsch ester =

Names
- Other names Diludine, 1,4-dihydro-2,6-dimethyl-3,5-pyridinedicarboxylic acid diethyl ester

Identifiers
CAS Number	1149-23-1
3D model (JSmol)	Interactive image
ChemSpider	64013
ECHA InfoCard	100.013.237
EC Number	214-561-6
PubChem CID	70849
UNII	GWN6123BUG
CompTox Dashboard (EPA)	DTXSID80150895
- InChI: InChI=1S/C13H19NO4/c1-5-17-12(15)10-7-11(13(16)18-6-2)9(4)14-8(10)3/h14H,5-7H2,1-4H3 Key: LJXTYJXBORAIHX-UHFFFAOYSA-N
- SMILES: CCOC(=O)C1=C(NC(=C(C1)C(=O)OCC)C)C

Properties
Chemical formula	C_{13}H_{19}NO_{4}
Molar mass	253.298 g·mol^{−1}
Appearance	colorless solid
Melting point	182–183 °C (360–361 °F; 455–456 K)
- Except where otherwise noted, data are given for materials in their standard state (at 25 °C [77 °F], 100 kPa). Infobox references

Hantzsch ester refers to an organic compound with the formula HN(MeC=C(CO_{2}Et))_{2}CH_{2} where Me = methyl (CH_{3}) and Et = ethyl (C_{2}H_{5}). It is a light yellow solid. The compound is a 1,4-dihydropyridine. It is named after Arthur Rudolf Hantzsch who described its synthesis in 1881. The compound is a hydride donor, e.g., for reduction of imines to amines. It is a synthetic analogue of NADH, a naturally occurring dihydropyridine.

== Preparation ==
Hantzsch ester can be made with a Hantzsch pyridine synthesis where formaldehyde, two equivalents of ethyl acetoacetate and ammonium acetate are combined to afford the product in high yield.

Hantzsch reaction with ammonium acetate, ethyl acetoacetate, and formaldehyde

== Structure ==
As confirmed by X-ray crystallography, Hantzsch ester has a planar C_{5}N core.

== See also ==
- Hantzsch pyrrole synthesis
