= Biocoal =

Biocoal may refer to:

- Hydrothermal carbonization, a moderate temperature water-based process to convert biomass to a coal-like substance
- Torrefaction, a mild form of pyrolysis to convert biomass to a char-like substance

== See also ==
- biochar
