= Johann Georg Anton Geuther =

German chemist (1833–1889)

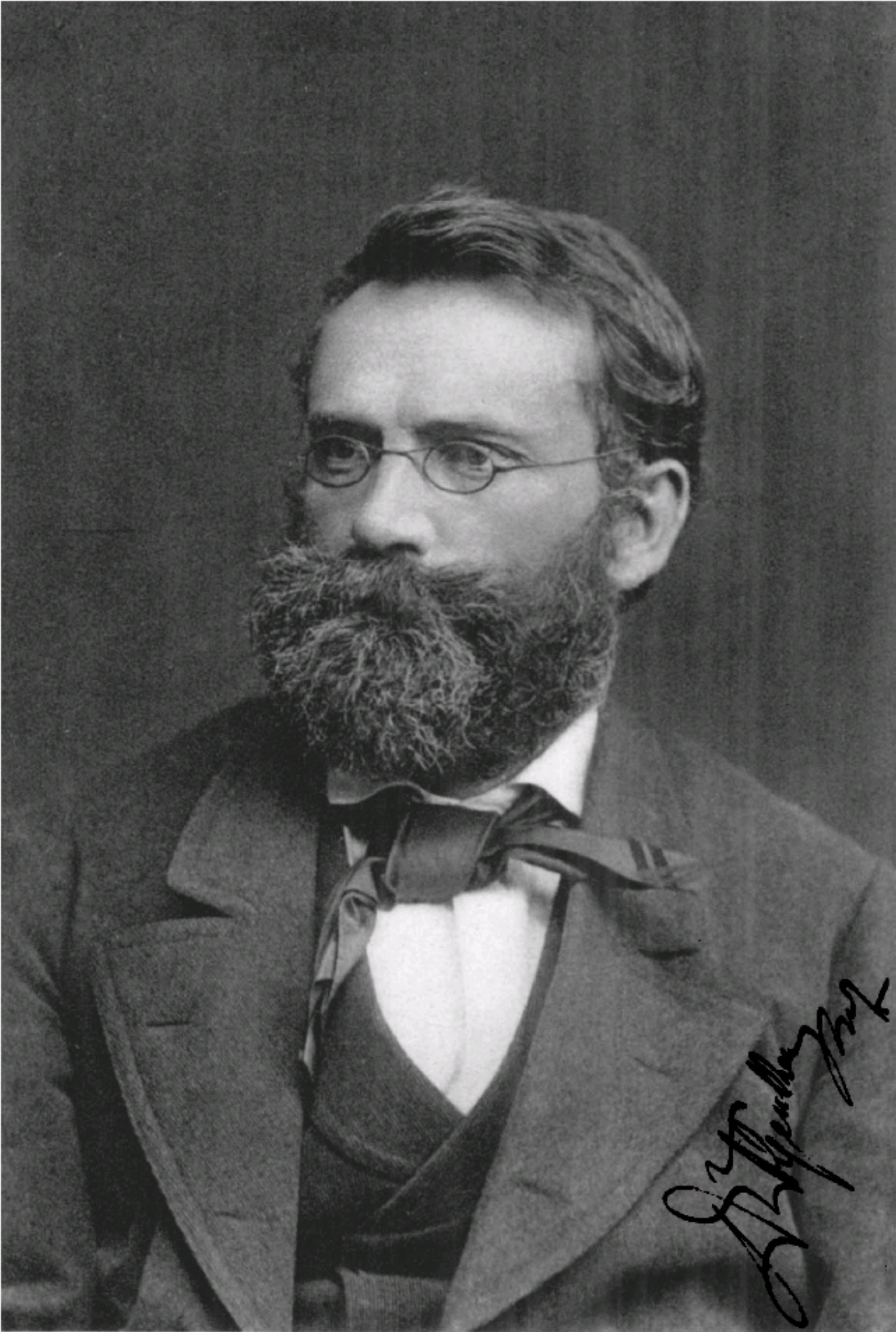
- Geuther, c. 1862
- Born: 23 April 1833; Neustadt bei Coburg, German Confederation
- Died: 23 August 1889 (aged 56); Jena, German Empire
- Education: University of Göttingen
- Scientific career
- Workplaces: University of Jena
- Academic advisors: Friedrich Wöhler
- Doctoral students: Carl Duisberg; Hans Hübner; August Michaelis

Johann Georg Anton Geuther (23 April 1833 – 23 August 1889) was a German chemist. His work in organic and inorganic chemistry influenced the development of coordination chemistry. Geuther spent most of his academic career at the University of Jena where he discovered ethyl acetoacetate, a key compound for chemical synthesis and for the discovery of tautomerism.

== Life ==
Geuther was born in Neustadt bei Coburg and was educated in Neustad, Coburg and Saalfeld. Although his family favoured education in the merchant business, he started to study chemistry at the University of Jena, but changed to the University of Göttingen in 1853. He received his PhD in 1855 for a work on oil shale carried out together with Friedrich Wöhler. In the following years, he gradually improved his position in Göttingen and became professor in the University of Jena in 1860. In 1883 he married and lived until his death with his wife, son and daughter in Jena. Geuther died of typhus in 1889 at the age of 57.

== Work ==
Geuther started to work on inorganic topics, such as the electrolysis of chromic acid and sulfuric acid to determine the similarities of the two compounds. His research on the constitution of several cobalt amine complexes, such as hexamminecobalt(III) chloride, were later completed by Alfred Werner earning Werner a Nobel Prize in Chemistry. Some of his organic research was connected to isomerism of chemical molecules. The experimental work on the hydrolysis of 1,1-dichloroethane, which yielded glycol, and the chlorination of acetaldehyde giving 1,2-dichloroethane provided a good starting point for the development of the theory of the constitution of compounds with the same chemical formula, but different bond structure.

Tautomeric forms for ethyl acetoacetate (for R = methyl and R' = ethyl)

Geuther is best known for his discovery of ethyl acetoacetate. Although he discovered the compound in 1863, it took him two years to publish results in a peer reviewed journal. The experimental work of his and others yielded puzzling results and induced debates on the nature of ethyl acetoacetate. The structure proposed by Edward Frankland and Duppa showed a keto group (C=O), while Geuther was certain about presence of an acidic OH group in the molecule. It was long after the death of Geuther when Ludwig Knorr, Geuthers successor at the University of Jena, solved the riddle proving both sides right: the true nature of ethyl acetoacetate was a tautomeric equilibrium between the both suggested structures. The Keto-enol tautomerism strongly depends on the solvent used for the experiments. Geuther was planning to build a new chemical laboratory at University of Jena, but died well before the construction had started. Some of his unfinished work was completed by his successor in Jena Ludwig Knorr.
