= Knoevenagel condensation =

Organic chemical reaction

Named after	Emil Knoevenagel
Reaction type	Coupling reaction

Identifiers
Organic Chemistry Portal	knoevenagel-condensation
RSC ontology ID	RXNO:0000044

In organic chemistry, the Knoevenagel condensation (pronounced [ˈknøːvənaːɡl̩]) reaction is a type of chemical reaction named after German chemist Emil Knoevenagel. It is a modification of the aldol condensation.

A Knoevenagel condensation is a nucleophilic addition of an active hydrogen compound to a carbonyl group followed by a dehydration reaction in which a molecule of water is eliminated (hence condensation). The product is often an α,β-unsaturated ketone (a conjugated enone).

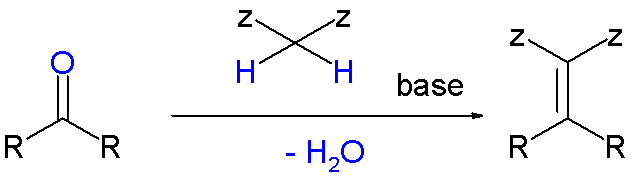
General Knoevenagel layout

In this reaction the carbonyl group is an aldehyde or a ketone. The catalyst is usually a weakly basic amine. The active hydrogen component has the forms:

- Z−CH_{2}−Z or Z−CHR−Z for instance diethyl malonate, Meldrum's acid, ethyl acetoacetate or malonic acid, or cyanoacetic acid.
- Z−CHRR', for instance nitromethane.

where Z is an electron withdrawing group. Z must be powerful enough to facilitate deprotonation to the enolate ion even with a mild base. Using a strong base in this reaction would induce self-condensation of the aldehyde or ketone.

The Hantzsch pyridine synthesis, the Gewald reaction and the Feist–Benary furan synthesis all contain a Knoevenagel reaction step. The reaction also led to the discovery of CS gas.

== Doebner modification ==
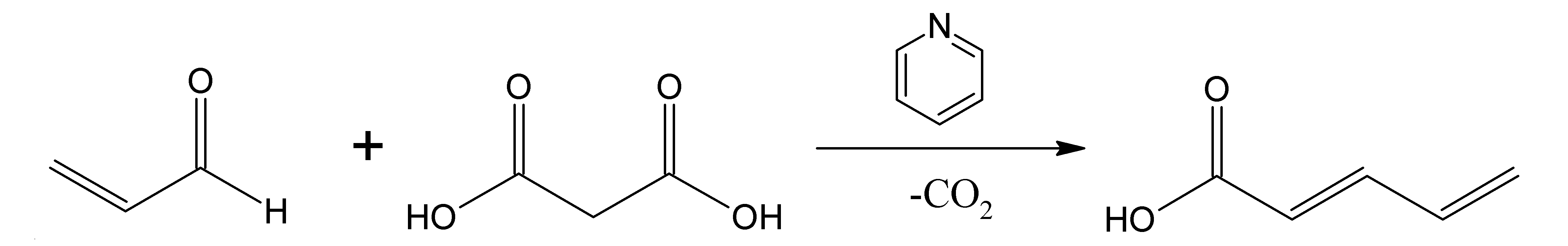
The Doebner modification of the Knoevenagel condensation. Acrolein and malonic acid react in pyridine to give trans-2,4-pentadienoic acid with the loss of carbon dioxide.

The Doebner modification of the Knoevenagel condensation entails the use of pyridine as a solvent with at least one of the withdrawing groups on the nucleophile is a carboxylic acid, for example, with malonic acid. Under these conditions the condensation is accompanied by decarboxylation. For example, the reaction of acrolein and malonic acid in pyridine gives trans-2,4-entadienoic acid with one carboxylic acid group and not two. Sorbic acid can be prepared similarly by replacing acrolein with crotonaldehyde.

== Examples and applications ==
A Knoevenagel condensation is demonstrated in the reaction of 2-methoxybenzaldehyde 1 with the thiobarbituric acid 2 in ethanol using piperidine as a base. The resulting enone 3 is a charge transfer complex molecule.

A knoevenagel condensation

The Knoevenagel condensation is a key step in the commercial production of the antimalarial drug lumefantrine:

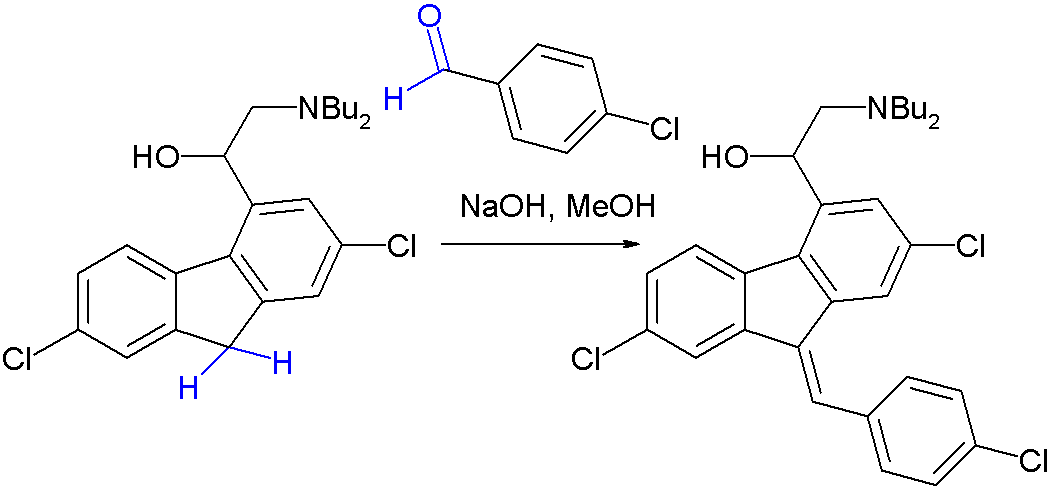
Final step in Lumefantrine synthesis

The initial reaction product is a 50:50 mixture of E and Z isomers but because both isomers equilibrate rapidly around their common hydroxyl precursor, the more stable Z-isomer can eventually be obtained.

A multicomponent reaction featuring a Knoevenagel condensation is demonstrated in this MORE synthesis with cyclohexanone, malononitrile and 3-amino-1,2,4-triazole:

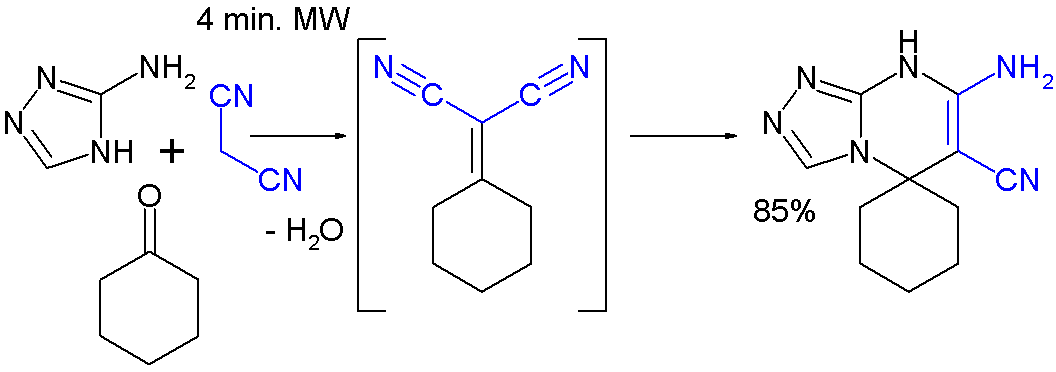
Knoevenagel tandem application

== Weiss–Cook reaction ==
The Weiss–Cook reaction consists in the synthesis of cis-bicyclo[3.3.0]octane-3,7-dione employing an acetonedicarboxylic acid ester and a diacyl (1,2 ketone). The mechanism operates in the same way as the Knoevenagel condensation:

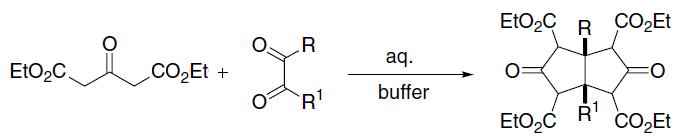

== See also ==
- Malonic ester synthesis
- Nitroalkene
- Iminocoumarin
