= Julius Pohl =

Julius Pohl (1 November 1861 in Prague – 27 September 1942 in Hamburg-Eimsbüttel) was an Austrian-German pharmacologist.

From 1879 to 1883 he studied medicine at the German University in Prague, where afterwards he worked as an assistant to Franz Hofmeister in the pharmacology institute. In 1892 he received his habilitation for pharmacology and pharmacognosy, and three years later became an associate professor. In 1897 he succeeded Hofmeister as chair of pharmacology at the university. In 1911 he relocated to the University of Breslau as successor to Wilhelm Filehne. In 1926 he became a member of the German Academy of Sciences Leopoldina.

His work included studies on serum proteins, the action of bromoacetic acid on muscle, the toxicity of chloroform, and the metabolic oxidation of alcohols and fatty acids. In 1891 he isolated the compound aristolochin from Aristolochia clematitis.

== Selected publications ==
- Ueber das Aristolochin, einen giftigen Bestandtheil der Aristolochia-Arten, 1891 – On aristolochin, a toxic component of Aristolochia species.
- Ueber die Oxydation des Methyl- und Aethylalcohols im Thierkorper, 1893 – On the oxidation of methyl and ethyl alcohols in the animal body.
- Ueber den oxydativen Abbau der Fettkörper im thierischen Organismus, 1896 – On oxidative reduction of fat in the animal organism.
- Franz Hofmeister, sein Leben und Wirken, 1923 – Franz Hofmeister, his life and work.

With Emil Starkenstein and Eugen Rost, he was co-author of Toxikologie ("Toxicology", 1929).
