= Fiesselmann thiophene synthesis =

Chemical reaction

Named after	Hans Fiesselmann
Reaction type	Ring forming reaction

The Fiesselmann thiophene synthesis is a name reaction in organic chemistry that allows for the generation of 3-hydroxy-2-thiophenecarboxylic acid derivatives from α,β-acetylenic esters with thioglycolic acid and its derivatives under the presence of a base. The reaction was developed by Hans Fiesselmann in the 1950s.

== Mechanism ==

After deprotonation, the thioglycolic acid ester attacks the triple bond of the alkyne. A second addition then takes place on the resulting double bond. The cyclization is initiated deprotonation of a thioglycolic acid ester moiety, and an alcoholate is eliminated from the resulting thiolane to yield a ketone. Elimination of a thioglycolic acid ester results in an α,β-unsaturated ketone, which tautomerizes to the desired product.

== Applications ==

A variation of the Fiesselmann synthesis by Lissavetzky starts from a cyclic β-ketoester and thioglycolic acid. In combination with an alcohol (R^{4}OH) the monoadduct is the main product. Without the addition of alcohol a thioacetal is generated. In presence of potassium hydroxide it can be esterificated and cyclisized. To cyclisize the mono adduct a sodium alcoholate is used.

If the substrate contains a nitrile instead of an ester group the reaction will result in 3-aminothiophenes. Scott used this approach to synthesis a p38 kinase inhibitor.

The reaction also works with aromatic derivates. Fry used this variation for the synthesis of tyrosinkinase inhibitors, starting from a substituted pyridine.

Nicolaou used the conditions of the Fiesselmann thiophene synthesis to show potential DNA cleaving properties of golfomycin A, a cyclic alkyne with potential antitumor activity. The Fiesselmann synthesis is also used to produce potential antiallergy agents, antileishmanial and antifungal agents and thieno[b]azepinediones.
