= Methyl acetoacetate =

Names
- IUPAC name methyl 3-oxobutanoate
- Other names: Acetoacetic acid methyl ester; Methyl acetylacetate; 3-Oxobutanoic acid methyl ester

Identifiers
CAS Number	105-45-3
3D model (JSmol)	Interactive image
ChEBI	CHEBI:166454
ChEMBL	ChEMBL3186053
ChemSpider	13874867
ECHA InfoCard	100.003.000
EC Number	203-299-8
PubChem CID	7757
UNII	CW4I82QAX1
UN number	1993
CompTox Dashboard (EPA)	DTXSID9026716
- InChI: InChI=1S/C5H8O3/c1-4(6)3-5(7)8-2/h3H2,1-2H3 Key: WRQNANDWMGAFTP-UHFFFAOYSA-N
- SMILES: COC(=O)CC(C)=O

Properties
Chemical formula	C_{5}H_{8}O_{3}
Molar mass	116.116 g·mol^{−1}
Appearance	Colourless liquid
Odor	Fruit or rum
Density	1.076 g/cm^{3}
Boiling point	166 °C (331 °F; 439 K)
Solubility in water	40 g/100 mL (20 °C)
Refractive index (n_{D})	1.411

Hazards
- GHS labelling
Pictograms	(GHS07: Exclamation mark)
Signal word	Warning
Hazard statements	H319
Precautionary statements	P305+P351+P338
NFPA 704 (fire diamond)	2 2
Flash point	70 °C (158 °F; 343 K)

Related compounds
Related esters	Ethyl acetoacetate; Ethyl acetate; Diethyl malonate
Related compounds	Acetone; Acetylacetone; Diketene
- Except where otherwise noted, data are given for materials in their standard state (at 25 °C [77 °F], 100 kPa). Infobox references

The organic compound methyl acetoacetate is the methyl ester of acetoacetic acid. It is a colorless liquid. It is used as a chemical intermediate. Many of its properties are similar to those for ethyl acetoacetate, which is more common.

At large scale, methyl acetoacetate is industrially produced by treatment of diketene with methanol.

== Safety and environmental considerations ==
Methyl acetoacetate has low toxicity to animals. It is highly biodegradable.
