= Friedrich Bergius =

German chemist (1884–1949)

Friedrich Karl Rudolf Bergius
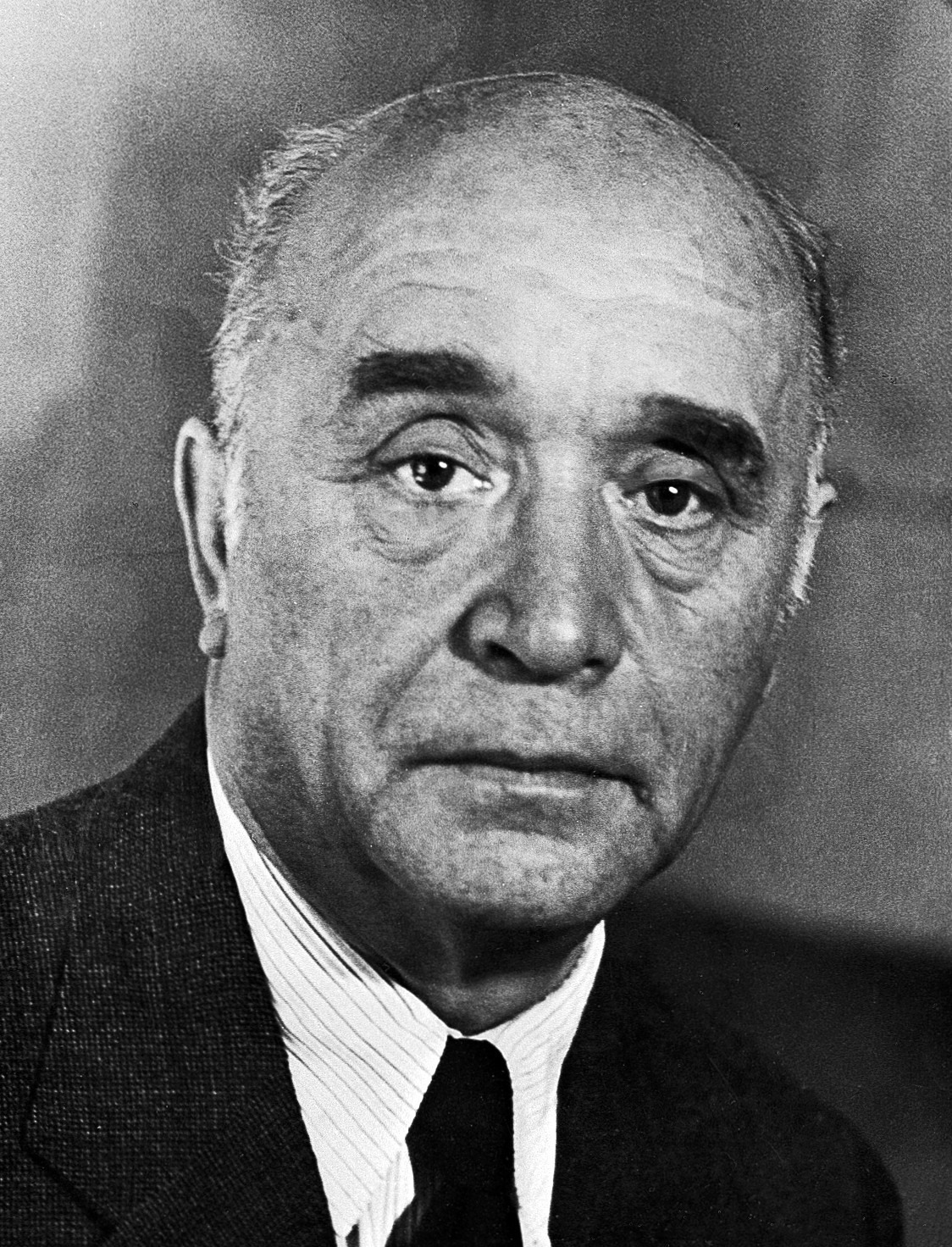
- Born: 11 October 1884; Breslau, German Empire (now Wrocław, Poland)
- Died: 30 March 1949 (aged 64); Buenos Aires, Argentina
- Education: University of Breslau, University of Leipzig
- Known for: Bergius process Hydrothermal carbonization
- Awards: Nobel Prize for Chemistry (1931); Melchett Medal (1934); Wilhelm Exner Medal (1937)
- Scientific career
- Fields: Chemistry
- Workplaces: Leibniz University Hannover
- Doctoral advisor: Arthur Rudolf Hantzsch
- Other academic advisors: Richard Abegg

Friedrich Karl Rudolf Bergius (German pronunciation: [ˈfʁiːdʁɪç ˈbɛʁɡi̯ʊs], 11 October 1884 – 30 March 1949) was a German chemist known for the Bergius process for producing synthetic fuel from coal, Nobel Prize in Chemistry (1931, together with Carl Bosch) in recognition of contributions to the invention and development of chemical high-pressure methods. Having worked with IG Farben during World War II, his citizenship came into question following the war, causing him to ultimately flee to Argentina, where he acted as adviser to the Ministry of Industry.

== Early life ==
Bergius was born near Breslau (Wrocław), then in the German Empire.

== Academic career ==
Before studying chemistry, Bergius was sent to work for 6 months at the Friedrich Wilhelms steel works in Mülheim. His studies started at the University of Breslau in 1903 and ended with a PhD in chemistry at the University of Leipzig in 1907, after only 4 years. His thesis on sulfuric acid as solvent was supervised by Arthur Rudolf Hantzsch. In 1909 Bergius worked for one semester with Fritz Haber and Carl Bosch at the University of Karlsruhe in the development of the Haber-Bosch Process. On the same year he was invited to work at the Leibniz University Hannover with Max Bodenstein, who developed the idea of chemical kinetics and held a position as professor.

== Work ==
=== Synthetic fuel from coal ===
During his habilitation, techniques for the high-pressure and high-temperature chemistry of carbon-containing substrates were developed, yielding a patent on the Bergius process in 1913. In this process liquid hydrocarbons used as synthetic fuel are produced by hydrogenation of lignite (brown coal). He developed the process well before the commonly known Fischer–Tropsch process. Theodor Goldschmidt invited him to build an industrial plant at his factory the Th. Goldschmidt AG in 1914. The production began only in 1919, after the World War I ended, when the need for fuel was already declining. The technical problems, inflation and the constant criticism of Franz Joseph Emil Fischer, which changed to support after a personal demonstration of the process, made the progress slow and Bergius sold his patent to BASF, where Carl Bosch worked on it. Before World War II several plants were built with an annual capacity of 4 million tons of synthetic fuel.

=== Sugar from wood ===
The hydrolysis of wood to produce sugar for industrial use became a hard task for Bergius. After he moved to Heidelberg he started to improve the process and planned an industrial scale production. The high costs and technical problems nearly led him to bankruptcy. A bailiff followed Bergius to Stockholm to get the money from his Nobel Prize in Chemistry in 1931.

The autarky movement before the World War II boosted the process and several plants were built. Bergius moved to Berlin where he was only marginally involved in the development. While he was in Bad Gastein Austria, his laboratory and his house were destroyed by an air raid. The rest of the war he stayed in Austria.

=== International engagement ===
After the war his citizenship was called into question because of his collaboration with IG Farben, resulting in his departure from Germany to work as an adviser in Italy, Turkey, Switzerland and Spain. He emigrated to Argentina, where he worked as an adviser to the Ministry of Industry. He died in Buenos Aires on 30 March 1949, and is buried in the Cementerio Alemán next to La Chacarita Cemetery.

== Awards ==
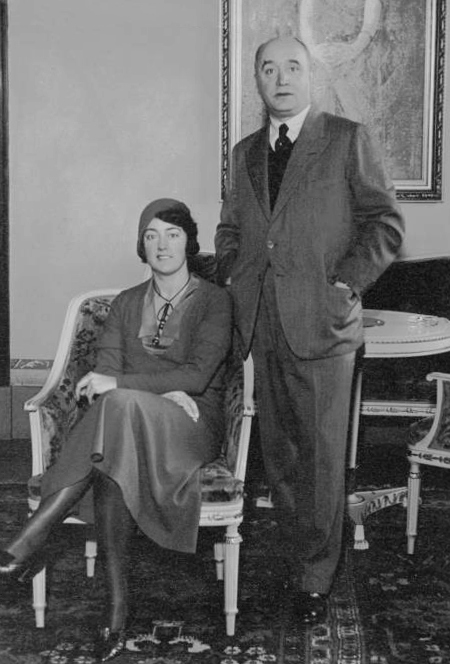
Bergius with wife in Stockholm in 1931

He and Carl Bosch won the Nobel Prize in Chemistry in 1931 in recognition of their contributions to the invention and development of chemical high-pressure methods. In 1937, he was awarded the Wilhelm Exner Medal.

== Personal life ==
Bergius was the father of Renate Burgess.
