= Renate Burgess =

British curator

- Born: Renate Ruth Adelheid Bergius; 2 August 1910; Hanover, Germany
- Died: 15 August 1988 (aged 78)

Renate Burgess, born Renate Ruth Adelheid Bergius (2 August 1910 – 15 August 1988) was a British art and medical historian and curator. From 1964 to 1980, she was the curator at the Wellcome Institute for the History of Medicine, responsible for catalogues and exhibitions of their extensive medical print, painting and photograph holdings. She earned a reputation as the world's leading expert in medical portraiture.

== Early life ==
Renate Burgess was born Renate Ruth Adelheid Bergius on 2 August 1910 in Hanover, Germany to Friedrich Bergius, a chemist who won the Nobel Prize in 1931, and Margarethe (Sachs) Bergius. Burgess pursued studies art history, archeology and French philology in Berlin and Munich, working with art historian Wilhelm Pinder and earning a Ph.D. in art history in 1935 at the Ludwig-Maximilians-Universität München.

== Career ==
The year she earned her doctorate, Nuremberg Laws stripped Burgess's citizenship as she had Jewish ancestry on her mother's side. She was then unable to find a teaching job, and instead she went to work in an art gallery. She also began teaching for the Confessing Church, Lutherans who rejected Nazism and totalitarian efforts to form a state church.

Burgess moved to England with very little money in 1938, having only been allowed to take 10 Marks with her. Initially she could not find employment in her field and worked as a secretary, domestic help and in a factory. Her interest in theology continued, and she trained to be a deaconess in the Church of England but ultimately decided against joining the ministry. Instead she trained as a nurse and midwife, working in these capacities from 1944 to 1951. From 1952 to 1962, she worked at the General Nursing Councill in clerical and translator capacities.

As a sideline, Burgess also worked as an art history researcher, a subject she had remained personally interested in. Her mother's second husband, Dr. Werner Leibbrand, hired her for occasional research projects for the Wellcome Institute for the History of Medicine. She applied to work there full time as a typist in 1963, but the interviewer realised her credentials qualified her to be curator of the institute's large collection of prints, paintings, and photographs. On 1 September 1964 she assumed the position, in which she would catalogue the more than 12,000 images of medical personnel Sir Henry Wellcome collected between 1900 and 1936. The catalogue, published in 1973 as Portraits of Doctors and Scientists in the Wellcome Institute, brought Burgess professional recognition as the leading expert on medical portraiture. A dedicated researcher who frequently spent off-hours in the British Library, Burgess was also recognized for her identification of painters behind notable works like St. Elizabeth Visiting a Hospital (an Adam Elsheimer painting from 1598), and a portrait of the surgeon Richard Wright (painted by his brother Joseph Wright of Derby in 1753), as well as for exhibitions she organized at the Wellcome Institute. Notable shows included Medicine in 1815, The History of Pharmacy, Chinese Medicine, The Child in History and particularly Dickens and Medicine. The latter, mounted in 1970, drew accolades from medical as well as literary scholars.

Burgess retired in 1980, though she continued working in an emeritus capacity at the institute.

== Death ==
Burgess married Hans Burgess (né Juliusburger) in 1950; the marriage ended in divorce. Burgess died in London on 15 August 1988.
