= Bruce H. Lipshutz =

American chemist

Bruce H. Lipshutz (born 1951) is an American chemist. He is a professor at the University of California, Santa Barbara.

== Biography ==
Lipshutz received his undergraduate degree in chemistry from Binghamton University in 1973. His graduate work was supervised by Harry H. Wasserman at Yale. After a PhD degree in 1977, he spent two years at Harvard as a post-doctoral researcher in the group of Nobel Laureate E. J. Corey. Soon after, he accepted a position of Assistant Professor at UCSB rising to the ranks of Professor in 1987. He has received the Alfred P. Sloan Foundation Fellowship and the Camille & Henry Dreyfus Teacher-Scholar Award. In 2011 he was awarded Presidential Green Chemistry Award. He is Co-founder of Zymes LLC.

== Contributions ==
=== Reagents ===
- Aqueous Micellar Catalysis using TPGS-750-M and Nok.
- Sustainable Palladium catalysis.
- 2-(Trimethylsilyl)ethoxymethyl chloride: hydroxyl protecting group, selectively cleaved with fluoride ion under mild conditions.
- Di-(4-chlorobenzyl)azodicarboxylate (DCAD): recyclable and convenient alternative to diethyl azodicarboxylate (DEAD) or diisopropyl azodicarboxylate (DIAD) in Mitsunobu reaction.
- Ligated copper hydride.
- Heterogeneous catalysts: nickel-on-charcoal, copper-on-charcoal, nickel-in-graphite, copper+nickel-on-charcoal.

=== Methodologies ===
- Higher-order organocuprates (Lipshutz cuprates).
- Chiral and achiral conjugate reductions.
- Catalyst development for ppm Pd-catalyzed C-C couplings in water at ambient
- Use of nonionic amphiphiles for transition metal-mediated cross coupling in organic synthesis.
- Low-cost synthesis of Coenzyme Q10.
