= Gewald reaction =

Organic reaction

Named after	Karl Gewald
Reaction type	Ring forming reaction

Identifiers
Organic Chemistry Portal	gewald-reaction

The Gewald reaction (or the Gewald aminothiophene synthesis) is an organic reaction involving the condensation of a ketone (or aldehyde when R^{2} = H) with a α-cyanoester in the presence of elemental sulfur and base to give a poly-substituted 2-amino-thiophene.

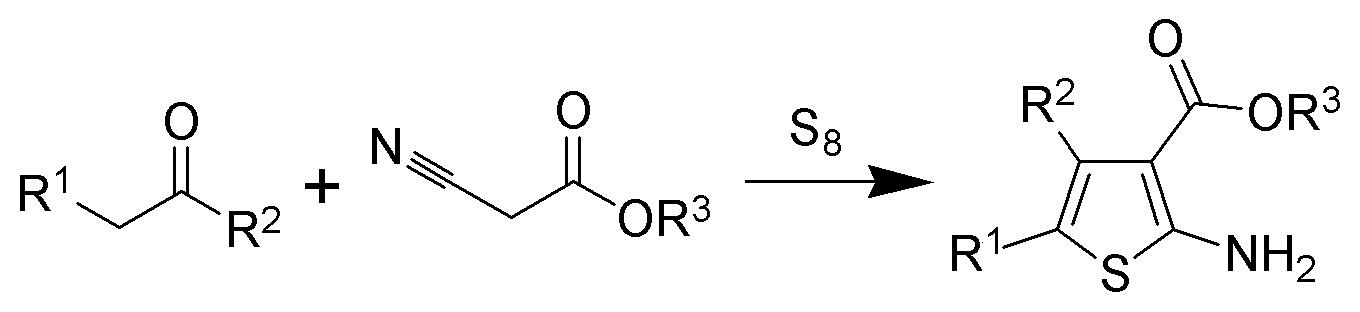
The Gewald reaction

The reaction is named after the German chemist Karl Gewald.

== Reaction mechanism ==
The reaction mechanism of the Gewald reaction was elucidated 30 years after the reaction was discovered. The first step is a Knoevenagel condensation between the ketone (1) and the α-cyanoester (2) to produce the stable intermediate 3. The mechanism of the addition of the elemental sulfur is unknown. It is postulated to proceed through intermediate 4. Cyclization and tautomerization will produce the desired product (6).

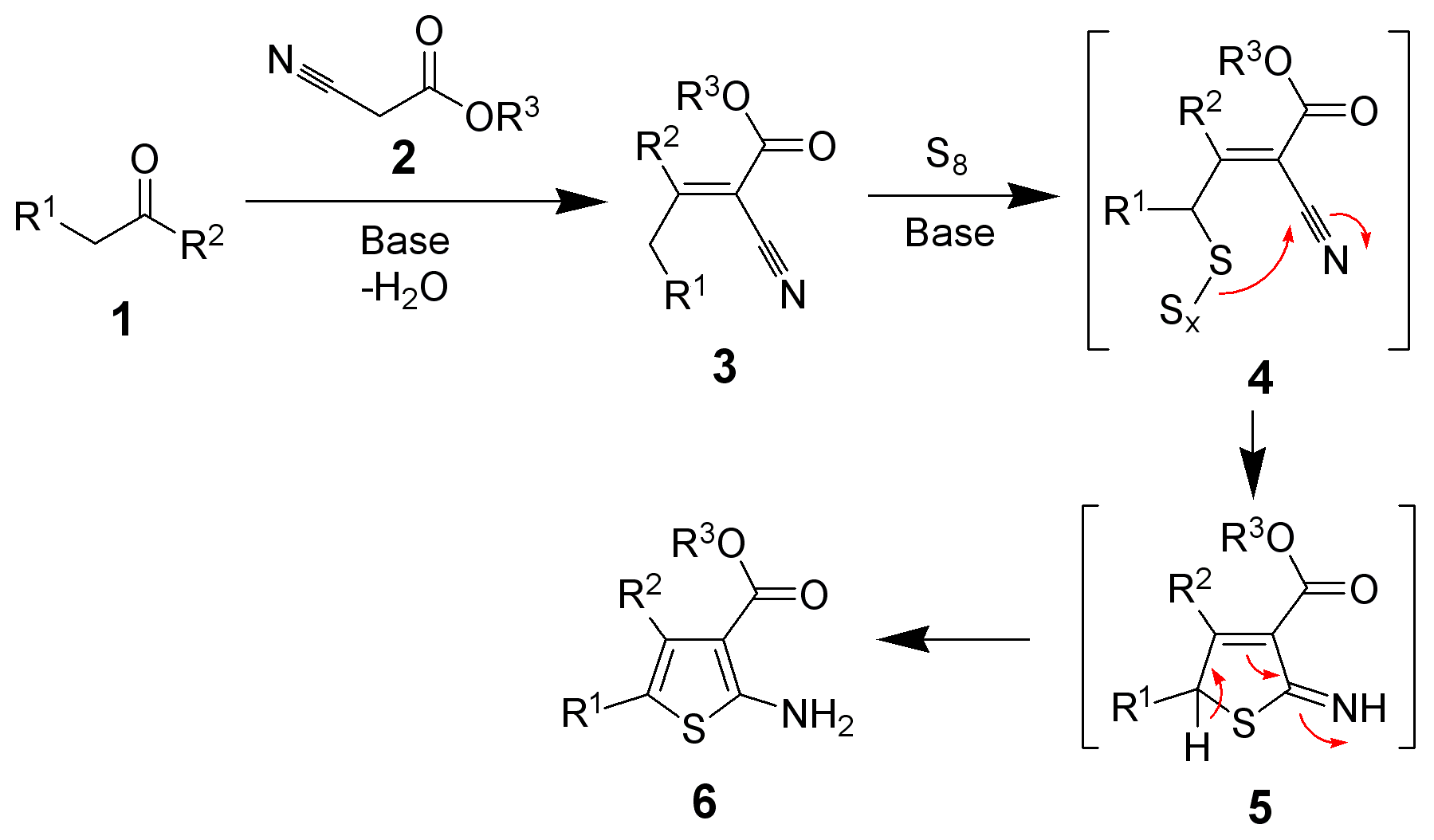
The mechanism of the Gewald reaction

Microwave irradiation has been shown beneficial to reaction yields and times.

== Variations ==
In one variation of the Gewald reaction a 3-acetyl-2-aminothiophene is synthesized starting from a dithiane (an adduct of sulfur and acetone if R = CH_{3} or acetaldehyde if R = H) and the sodium salt of cyanoacetone which in itself is very unstable:

1-(2-Amino-4-methyl-3-thienyl)ethanone synthesis
