= Iminocoumarin =

Iminocoumarins are a group of chemicals consisting of a coumarin with an attached imine group.

Many derivatives of 2-iminocoumarin are applied as luminescence indicators, laser dyes, also they are known as biologically active compounds. Furthermore, structural features of 2-iminopyrane cycle cause unusual reactivity of these compounds. Most of the reported transformations affect directly the iminopyrane cycle, and the iminogroup is the main target for nucleophilic and electrophilic attacks in many cases. However furthermore the iminogroup these compounds can contain other functional groups, which can participate in such interactions. Thus, vicinal arrangement of the imino and amide nucleophilic groups in 2-iminocoumarin-3-(thio)carboxoamides 4, 5 produces great opportunity to utilize these compounds as building blocks to construct different heterocyclic systems.

Iminocoumarins can be formed by a variation of the Knoevenagel condensation by reaction of salicylaldehyde with substituted acetonitriles.
