= Arthur Rudolf Hantzsch =

German chemist (1857–1935)

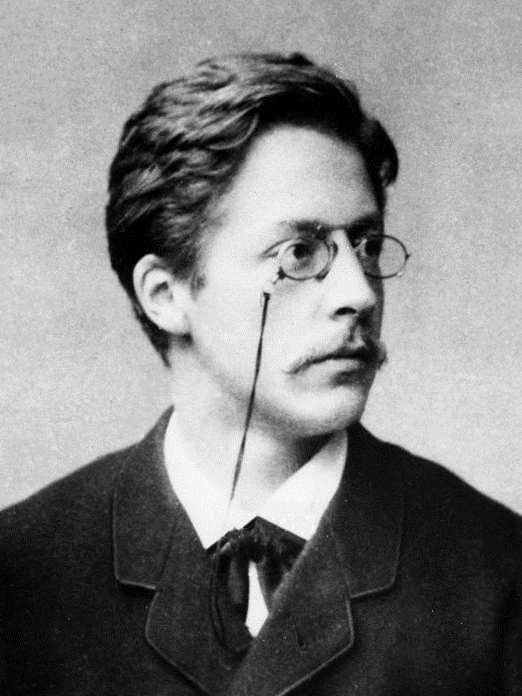
- Born: 7 March 1857; Dresden, Kingdom of Saxony
- Died: 14 March 1935 (aged 78); Dresden, Germany
- Education: University of Würzburg
- Known for: Hantzsch ester; Hantzsch thiazole synthesis; Hantzsch pyridine synthesis; Hantzsch pyrrole synthesis; Hantzsch–Widman nomenclature
- Scientific career
- Workplaces: University of Zürich; University of Würzburg; University of Leipzig
- Doctoral advisor: Johannes Wislicenus
- Doctoral students: Traugott Sandmeyer; Friedrich Bergius; Alfred Werner; Franz Hein

Arthur Rudolf Hantzsch (7 March 1857 – 14 March 1935) was a German chemist.

== Life and work ==
Hantzsch studied chemistry in Dresden and graduated at the University of Würzburg under Johannes Wislicenus. As a professor, he taught at the Universities of Zürich, Würzburg und Leipzig.

The Hantzsch pyridine synthesis, a multi-component organic reaction, is named after him, as is the Hantzsch pyrrole synthesis and the Hantzsch thiazole synthesis.

His surname is correctly pronounced /Haːntʃ/ (rhymes with cattle ranch).
