= Fructone =

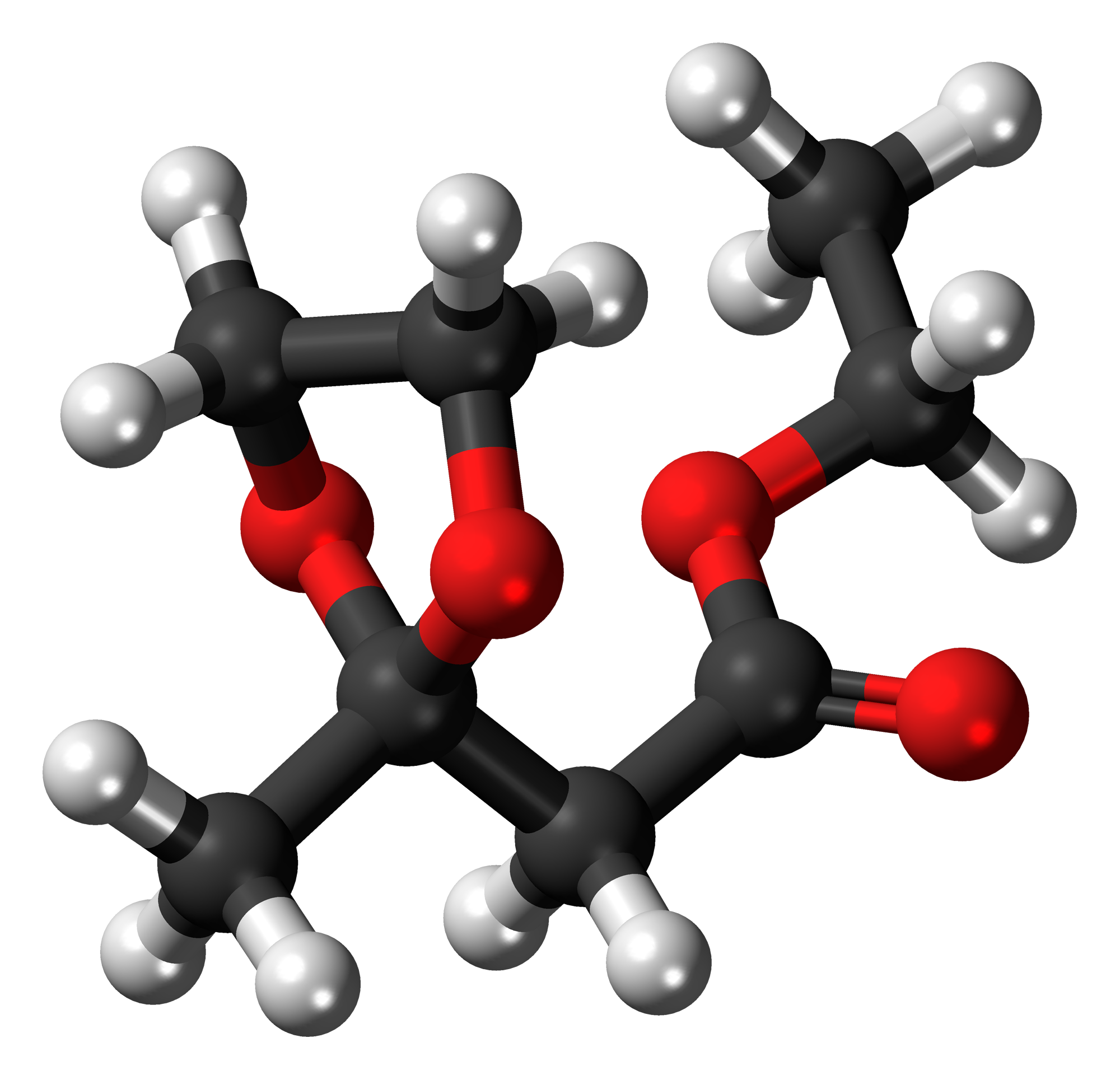

Names
- Preferred IUPAC name Ethyl (2-methyl-1,3-dioxolan-2-yl)acetate
- Other names Ethyl 2-(2-methyl-1,3-dioxolan-2-yl)acetate

Identifiers
CAS Number	6413-10-1
3D model (JSmol)	Interactive image
ChemSpider	72995
ECHA InfoCard	100.026.467
EC Number	229-114-0
PubChem CID	80865
UNII	G5EXI4NID0
CompTox Dashboard (EPA)	DTXSID3041241
- InChI: InChI=1S/C8H14O4/c1-3-10-7(9)6-8(2)11-4-5-12-8/h3-6H2,1-2H3 Key: XWEOGMYZFCHQNT-UHFFFAOYSA-N
- SMILES: CC1(OCCO1)CC(OCC)=O

Properties
Chemical formula	C_{8}H_{14}O_{4}
Molar mass	174.19
Appearance	Clear liquid
Density	1.067 g/cm^{3} ^{(1)}
Boiling point	207.99 (760 mmHg)
Solubility in water	1.893 g/L

Hazards
Flash point	97 °C (207 °F; 370 K)
- Except where otherwise noted, data are given for materials in their standard state (at 25 °C [77 °F], 100 kPa). verify (what is ?) Infobox references

Fructone is the organic compound with the formula CH_{3}C(O_{2}C_{2}H_{4})CH_{2}CO_{2}C_{2}H_{5} It is the ketal derived from the condensation of ethyl acetoacetate and ethylene glycol. Also known as apple ketal and applinal, it has a fruity, apple-like smell with pineapple, strawberry, and woody aspects reminiscent of pine trees (described as "sweet, fruity, apple, green, tropical, plum, woody"). It is a commercial fragrance.
