= Emil Knoevenagel =

German chemist (1865–1921)

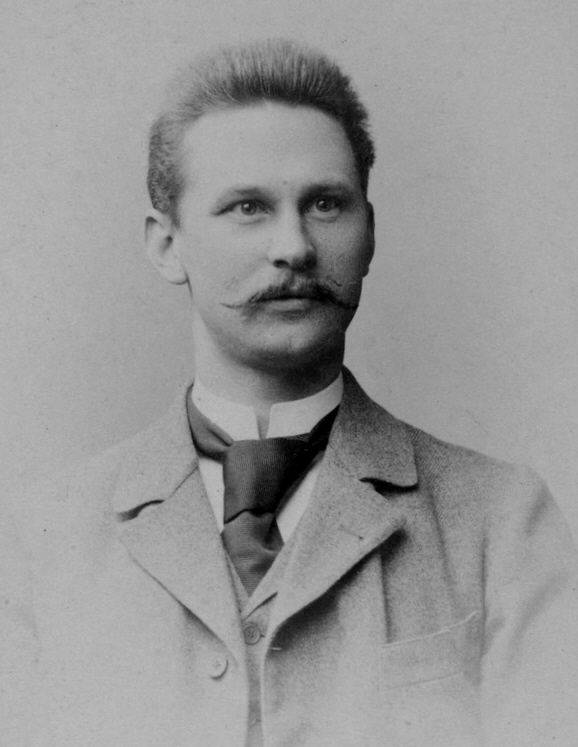
- Emil Knoevenagel in Heidelberg for his habilitation
- Born: 18 June 1865; Hannover, Kingdom of Hanover
- Died: 11 August 1921 (aged 56); Berlin, Weimar Republic
- Known for: Knoevenagel condensation
- Scientific career
- Doctoral advisor: Viktor Meyer

Heinrich Emil Albert Knoevenagel (German pronunciation: [ˈhaɪnʁɪç ˈʔeːmiːl ˈʔalbɛʁt ˈknøːvəˌnaːɡl̩]; 18 June 1865 – 11 August 1921) was the German chemist who established the Knoevenagel condensation reaction. The Knoevenagel condensation reaction of carbonyl compounds with active methylene compounds is a classic method for the preparation of conjugated alkenes, which are very valuable synthetic intermediates (e.g. Michael acceptors).

== Works ==
- Beiträge zur Kenntnis der negativen Natur-organischer Radikale (in German). Göttingen: Kaestner. 1889.
- Praktikum des anorganischen Chemikers : Einführung in die anorganische Chemie auf experimenteller Grundlage . Veit, Leipzig 2nd ed. 1909 Digital edition by the University and State Library Düsseldorf
