= Wilhelm Filehne =

German pharmacologist (1844–1927)

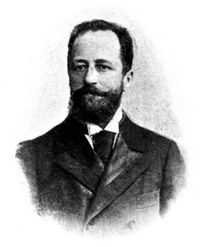
Wilhelm Filehne

Wilhelm Filehne (12 February 1844, in Posen – 29 April 1927, in Bensheim) was a German pharmacologist, who specialized in research of antipyretic drugs.

He studied medicine at the universities of Heidelberg and Berlin, where his instructors included Emil du Bois-Reymond and Friedrich Theodor von Frerichs. In 1866 he received his doctorate, and afterwards, he worked as assistant under Rudolf Virchow in Berlin. After participation in the Franco-Prussian War, he returned to Berlin as an assistant to Ludwig Traube. In 1874 he relocated to the University of Erlangen, where he worked as an assistant under Wilhelm Olivier Leube at the medical polyclinic.

In 1876 he became an associate professor of pharmacology at Erlangen, and ten years later, was appointed a full professor of the same subject at the University of Breslau. In 1911 he was succeeded at Breslau by Julius Pohl.

In addition to work in the field of pharmacology, he made contributions in his research of optical illusions, being known for his experimentation with a phenomenon known as a Zöllner illusion. The so-called "Filehne illusion" is the illusory motion of a stationary background when smooth pursuit eye movements are made across the stationary background.

== Selected works ==
- Ueber die einwirkung des morphins auf die athmung, 1879 – On the effect of morphine on respiration.
- Ueber das Antipyrin, ein neues Antipyreticum, 1884 – On antipyrine, a new antipyretic.
- Lehrbuch der Arzneimittellehre und Arzneiverordnungslehre, 1887 – Textbook of pharmacology.
- Ueber das Pyramidon, ein Antipyrinderivat, 1896 – On Pyramidon, an antipyrine derivative.
