= Feist–Benary synthesis =

Chemical reaction

| Named after | Franz Feist; Erich Benary |
| Reaction type | Ring forming reaction |

Identifiers
| RSC ontology ID | RXNO:0000501 |

The Feist–Benary synthesis is an organic reaction between α-halo ketones and β-dicarbonyl compounds to produce substituted furan compounds. This condensation reaction is catalyzed by amines such as ammonia and pyridine. The first step in the ring synthesis is related to the Knoevenagel condensation. In the second step the enolate displaces an alkyl halogen in a nucleophilic aliphatic substitution.

Feist Benary synthesis

== Modifications ==
In place of α-haloketones, propargyl sulfonium salts can be used to alkylate the diketone.

Another modification is the enantioselective interrupted Feist-Benary reaction with a chiral auxiliary based on the cinchona alkaloid quinine based in the presence of proton sponge to the hydroxydihydrofuran. This type of alkaloids is also used in asymmetric synthesis in the AD-mix. The alkaloid is protonated throughout the reaction and transfers its chirality by interaction of the acidic ammonium hydrogen with the dicarbonyl group of ethyl bromopyruvate in a 5-membered transition state.

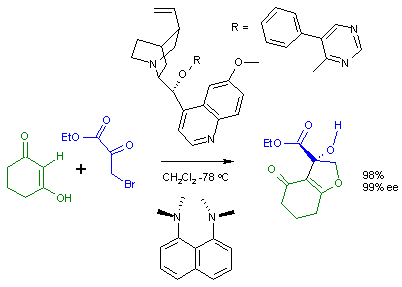
interrupted Feist-Benary reaction

== Historic references ==
- Franz Feist (1902). "Studien in der Furan- und Pyrrol-Gruppe". Chemische Berichte. 35 (2): 1537–1544. doi:10.1002/cber.19020350263.
- Erich Benary (1911). "Synthese von Pyridin-Derivaten aus Dichlor-äther und β-Amino-crotonsäureester". Chemische Berichte. 44: 489–493). doi:10.1002/cber.19110440175.
