= Hantzsch pyrrole synthesis =

Chemical reaction

The Hantzsch Pyrrole Synthesis, named for Arthur Rudolf Hantzsch, is the chemical reaction of β-ketoesters (1) with ammonia (or primary amines) and α-haloketones (2) to give substituted pyrroles (3). Pyrroles are found in a variety of natural products with biological activity, so the synthesis of substituted pyrroles has important applications in medicinal chemistry. Alternative methods for synthesizing pyrroles exist, such as the Knorr Pyrrole Synthesis and Paal-Knorr Synthesis.

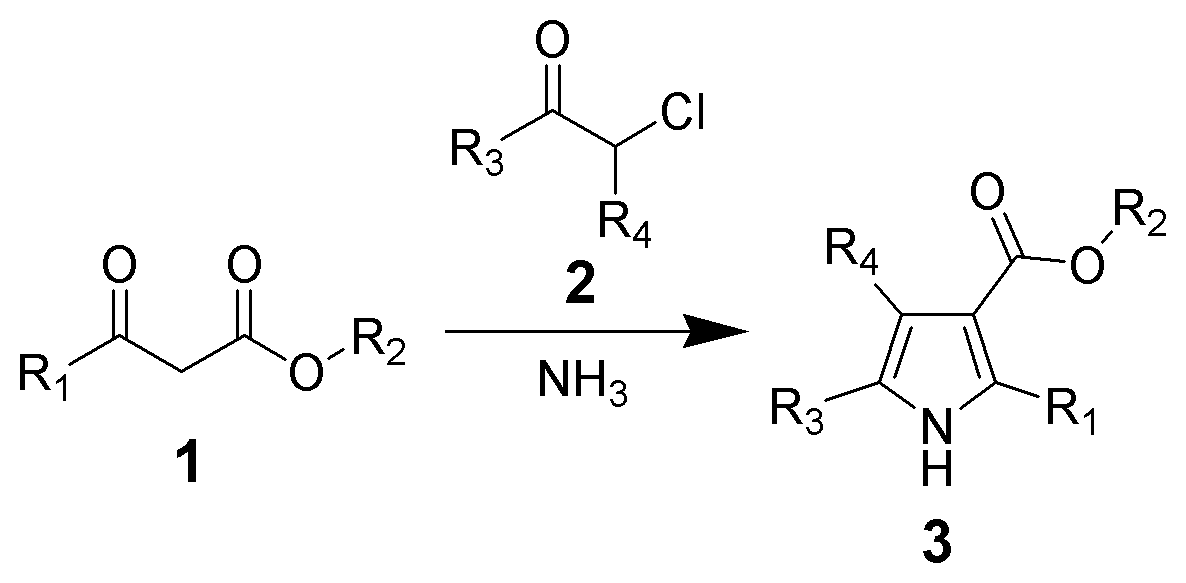
The Hantzsch pyrrole synthesis

== Mechanism ==
Below is one published mechanism for the reaction:

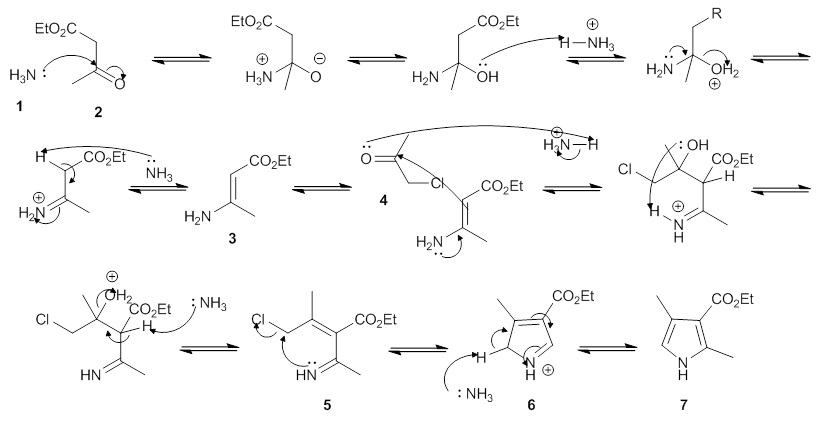
Mechanism for the Hantzsch Pyrrole Synthesis

The mechanism starts with the amine (1) attacking the β carbon of the β-ketoesters (2), and eventually forming an enamine (3). The enamine then attacks the carbonyl carbon of the α-haloketone (4). This is followed by the loss of H_{2}O, giving an imine (5). This intermediate undergoes an intramolecular nucleophilic attack, forming a 5-membered ring (6). Finally, a hydrogen is eliminated and the pi-bonds are rearranged in the ring, yielding the final product (7).

An alternative mechanism has been proposed in which the enamine (3) attacks the α-carbon of the α-haloketone (4) as part of a nucleophilic substitution, instead of attacking the carbonyl carbon.

== Generalized reaction under mechanochemical conditions ==
A generalization of the Hantzsch pyrrole synthesis was developed by Estevez, et al. In this reaction highly substituted pyrroles can be synthesized in a one-pot reaction, with relatively high yields (60% - 97%). This reaction involves the high-speed vibration milling (HSVM) of ketones with N-iodosuccinimide (NIS) and p-toluenesulfonic acid, to form an α-iodoketone in situ. This is followed by addition of a primary amine, a β-dicarbonyl compound, cerium(IV) ammonium nitrate (CAN) and silver nitrate, as shown in the scheme below:

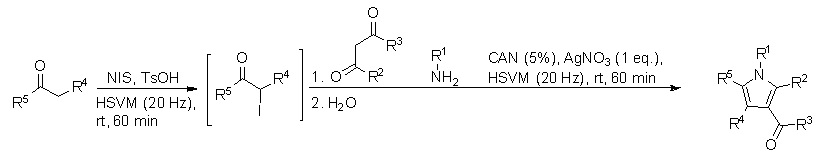
Reaction Scheme for Generalized Hantzsch Pyrrole Synthesis

== Applications ==
=== 2,3-dicarbonylated pyrroles ===
2,3-dicarbonylated pyrroles can be synthesized by a version of the Hantzsch Pyrrole Synthesis. These pyrroles are particularly useful for total synthesis because the carbonyl groups can be converted into a variety of other functional groups.

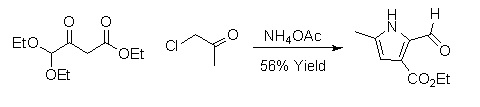
Reaction Scheme for Generalized Hantzsch Pyrrole Synthesis

=== Substituted indoles ===
The reaction can also occur between an enamine and an α-haloketone to synthesize substituted indoles, which also have biological significance.

Reaction for Substituted Indols by Hantzsch Pyrrole Synthesis

=== Continuous flow chemistry ===
A library of substituted pyrrole analogs can be quickly produced by using continuous flow chemistry (reaction times of around 8 min.). The advantage of using this method, as opposed to the in-flask synthesis, is that this one does not require the work-up and purification of several intermediates, and could therefore lead to a higher percent yield.

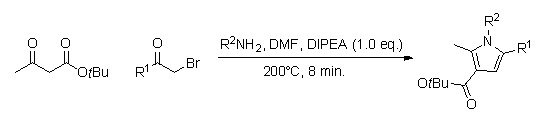
Hantzsch Pyrrole Synthesis Using Continuous Flow Chemistry

== See also ==
- Hantzsch pyridine synthesis
