= 2-(Trimethylsilyl)ethoxymethyl chloride =

Names
- Preferred IUPAC name [2-(Chloromethoxy)ethyl]tri(methyl)silane

Identifiers
| CAS Number | 76513-69-4 |
| 3D model (JSmol) | Interactive image |
| ChemSpider | 2006421 |
| ECHA InfoCard | 100.071.328 |
| EC Number | 278-483-4 |
| PubChem CID | 2724271 |
| UNII | G8Q8Y64LT8 |
| CompTox Dashboard (EPA) | DTXSID10227327 |
- InChI: InChI=1S/C6H15ClOSi/c1-9(2,3)5-4-8-6-7/h4-6H2,1-3H3 Key: BPXKZEMBEZGUAH-UHFFFAOYSA-N
- SMILES: C[Si](C)(C)CCOCCl

Properties
| Chemical formula | C_{6}H_{15}ClOSi |
| Molar mass | 166.72 g·mol^{−1} |
| Appearance | Colorless liquid |
| Boiling point | 57–59 °C (330–332 K) (8 mmHg) |

Hazards
- GHS labelling
| Pictograms | (GHS02: Flammable) (GHS05: Corrosive) |
| Signal word | Danger |
| Hazard statements | H226, H314 |
| Precautionary statements | P210, P233, P240, P241, P242, P243, P260, P264, P280, P301+P330+P331, P303+P361+P353, P304+P340, P305+P351+P338, P310, P321, P363, P370+P378, P403+P235, P405, P501 |
- Except where otherwise noted, data are given for materials in their standard state (at 25 °C [77 °F], 100 kPa). Infobox references

2-(Trimethylsilyl)ethoxymethyl chloride (SEM-Cl) is an organochlorine compound with the formula C_{6}H_{15}ClOSi, which was developed by Bruce H. Lipshutz during his work on the synthesis of N-methylmaysenine. It is used to protect hydroxyl groups, which can be cleaved with fluoride in organic solvents selectively under mild conditions. Typically tetrabutylammonium fluoride and caesium fluoride can be used as deprotection reagents. Alternatives such as magnesium bromide, lithium tetrafluoroborate and boron trifluoride etherate were also developed to deprotect SEM group.
