= Hydrothermal carbonization =

Converting wet biomass into solid material

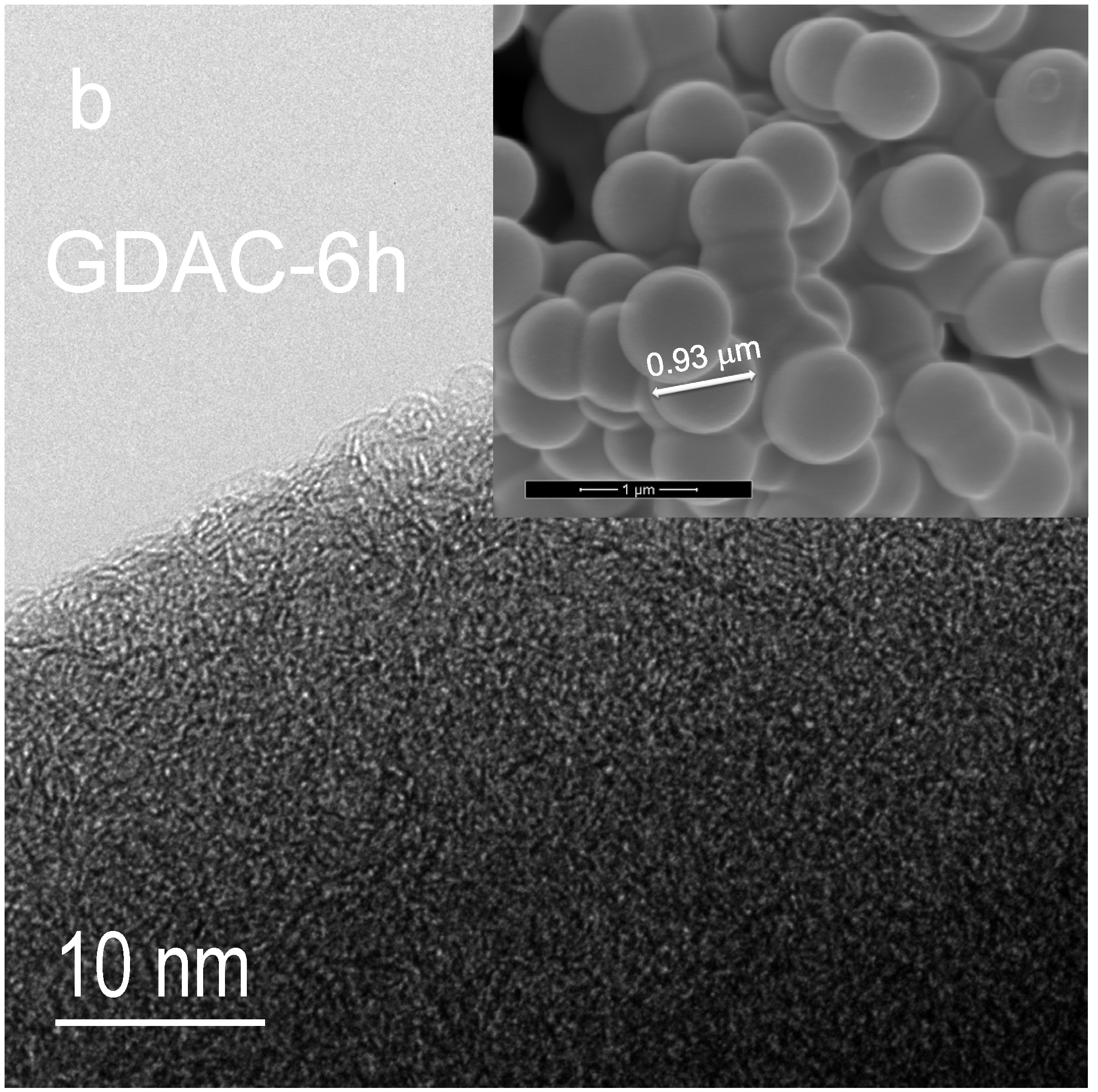
Carbon microballs made from glucose via hydrothermal carbonization, that have been processed with CO_{2} for 6 hours to change surface properties. SEM image from University of Tartu (Estonia).

Hydrothermal carbonization (HTC) (also referred to as "aqueous carbonization at elevated temperature and pressure") is a chemical process for the conversion of organic compounds to structured carbons. It can be used to make a wide variety of nanostructured carbons, simple production of brown coal substitute, synthesis gas, liquid petroleum precursors, and humus from biomass with the release of energy. Technically, the process imitates, within a few hours, the brown coal formation process (German "Inkohlung", literally "coalification"), which takes place in nature over enormously longer geological periods of 50,000 to 50 million years. It was investigated by Friedrich Bergius and first described in 1913.

== Motivation ==
The carbon efficiency of most processes for converting organic matter into fuel is relatively low, i.e., the proportion of carbon contained in the biomass, which is later contained in the usable end product, is relatively low:

Process	Carbon efficiency
alcoholic fermentation	67%
gasification to H_{2} or CH_{4}	60%
gasification and Fischer-Tropsch synthesis	50%
anaerobic conversion to biogas	50%
wood charcoal production	30%
production of humus by composting	5% to 10%

In poorly designed systems, the unused carbon escapes into the atmosphere as carbon dioxide, or, when fermented, as methane. Both gases are greenhouse gases with methane even more climate-active on a per molecule basis than CO_{2}. In addition, the heat that is released in these processes is not generally used. Advanced modern systems capture nearly all the gases and use the heat as part of the process or for district heating.

The problem with the production of biodiesel from oil plants is that only the energy contained in the fruit can be used. If the entire plant could be used for fuel production, the energy yield could be increased by a factor of three to five with the same cultivation area when growing fast-growing plants such as willow, poplar, miscanthus, hemp, reeds or forestry, while simultaneously reducing energy, fertilizer and herbicide use, with the possibility of using – for current energy plant cultivation – poor soil. Hydrothermal carbonization makes it possible - similar to the biomass-to-liquid process – to use almost all of the carbon contained in the biomass for fuel generation. It is a new variation of an old field (biomass conversion to biofuel) that has recently been further developed in Germany. It involves moderate temperatures and pressures over an aqueous solution of biomass in a dilute acid for several hours. The resulting matter reportedly captures 100% of the carbon in a "charcoal" powder that could provide a feed source for soil amendment (similar to biochar) and further studies in economic nanomaterial production.

== Process ==
Biomass is heated together with water to 180 °C (356 °F) in a pressure vessel, in particular vegetable material (in the following reaction equation, simplified as sugar with the formula C_{6}H_{12}O_{6}). The pressure rises to about 1 megapascal (150 psi). During the reaction, oxonium ions are also formed, which reduce the pH to pH 5 and lower. This step can be accelerated by adding a small amount of citric acid. In this case, at low pH values, more carbon passes into the aqueous phase. The effluent reaction is exothermic, that is, energy is released. After 12 hours, the carbon of the reactants is completely reacted, 90 to 99% of the carbon is present as an aqueous sludge of porous brown coal spheres (C_{6}H_{2}O) with pore sizes between 8 and 20 nm as a solid phase, the remaining 1 to 10% of carbon is either dissolved in the aqueous phase or converted to carbon dioxide. The reaction equation for the formation of brown coal is:

$$\mathrm{C_6H_{12}O_6} \quad \rightarrow \quad \mathrm{C_6H_2O} + \mathrm{5\ H_2O \qquad \Delta H = -1.105\ \mathrm{kJ/mol}}$$

The reaction can be stopped at several stages, leading to incomplete elimination of water and yielding different intermediate products. After a few minutes, liquid intermediate lipophilic substances form, but they are very difficult to handle due to their high reactivity. Subsequently, these substances polymerize and form peat-like structures, which are present as intermediates after about 8 hours.

== Efficiency ==
As a result of the exothermic reaction of hydrothermal carbonization, about 3/8 of the calorific value of the biomass based on the dry mass is released (with a high lignin, resin and/or oil content of at least 1/4). If the process is managed properly, it is possible to use this waste heat from wet biomass to produce dry biocoal and to use some of the converted energy for energy generation.

In a large-scale technical implementation of hydrothermal carbonization of sewage sludge, it has been shown that about 20% of the fuel energy content contained in 90% end-dried HTC coal is required to heat the process. Furthermore, approximately 5% of the generated energy is required for the plant's electrical operation. It has proved particularly beneficial in the case of the HTC process that, with mechanical dehydration, more than 60% of the dry substance content can be achieved in the raw carbon, and thus the energy and equipment expenditure for the final drying of the coal is low compared to conventional drying methods of these slurries.

Compared to sludge digestion with subsequent drying, the HTC requires approximately 20% less electrical energy and approximately 70% less thermal energy. The amount of energy produced by the HTC as a storable coal is simultaneously 10% higher. Compared to conventional thermal drying of sewage sludge, the HTC saves 62% of electricity and 69% of thermal energy due to its significantly simpler drainage.

== Benefits ==
- An exothermic process design would be advantageous in which the carbon content remains biologically, chemically, or thermally convertible without further oxidation of the biomass. This could lead to a specific reduction in CO_{2} release.
- According to Markus Antonietti, the most important point is "... that one has a simple method of transforming atmospheric CO_{2} via the detour of biomass into a stable and safe storage form, a carbon sink." With hydrothermal carbonization, as well as with other methods for the creation of "charcoal", a large quantity of carbon could be stored decently all over the world. Essentially safer than the currently discussed liquid or gaseous sequestration of carbon dioxide. With sufficient chemical stability, coal can also be used very effectively to improve soils (see also Terra preta).
- Artificial humus could be used for the re-greening of eroded surfaces. Due to increased plant growth, additional carbon dioxide could be bound from the atmosphere, enabling a carbon efficiency greater than 1 or a negative CO_{2} balance. The resulting carbon sludge could be used to burn or operate novel fuel cell types with a 60% efficiency, as currently being researched at Harvard University. To produce conventional fuels, the carbon-water mixture would have to be heated more intensively, so that so-called synthesis gas, a gas mixture of carbon monoxide and hydrogen, is formed:

$$\mathrm{C_6H_2O} + \mathrm{5\ H_2O} \quad \rightarrow \quad \mathrm{6\ CO} + \mathrm{6\ H_2}$$

This synthesis gas could be used to produce gasoline via the Fischer–Tropsch process. Alternatively, the liquid intermediates formed during incomplete biomass conversion could be used for fuel and plastic production.

- In addition, the resulting carbon mud can be made into briquettes and marketed as an environmentally friendly carbon dioxide-neutral "natural carbon" – Compared with the starting biomass, this can be dried by using deposition filtering or pressing with lower energy consumption and, due to its higher energy content per volume or mass, reduce transport costs and require smaller storage areas.
- An advantage of hydrothermal carbonation is that the usability of plant biomass is not restricted to plants with low moisture contents, and the energy that can be obtained without carbon dioxide emission is not reduced by necessary drying measures or is usable directly for drying the end products. For example, even scarcely usable plant material, such as waste from gardens and urban green areas, can be used to produce energy, Carbon dioxide is also being saved, which, together with even more climate-damaging methane, would otherwise be produced by bacterial conversion of the biomass.
- In recent years, HTC has been applied as upstream conditioning technology for phosphorus recovery from sewage sludge with the benefit of higher yields.

== Problems ==
- A problem in the production of synthesis gas from biomass is the formation of tar, which can be avoided during hydrothermal process management.
- Biomass is usually processed at a temperature range of (180-350 °C) the biomass is then submerged in water and heated under the pressure of (2-6 MPa) for (5–240 minutes). And the temperature and pressure will need a high energy input.
- Another problem with hydrothermal carbonisation is the fact that the autoclave or similar device used can be very expensive, which means apart from industrial, research and demonstration purposes, HTC is usually not financially available, especially for the general public.
- Appropriate process management, as well as problems in the collection, transportation, and storage of accumulated biomass, are things that could make processing using HTC unprofitable. These processes also require energy, which should be less than that released by hydrothermal carbonisation.

== Current application intentions ==
Mexico City began construction of the first HTC module to convert 23,000 tons of organic waste per year in 2022. The plant is based on the TerraNova HTC technology and includes a pyrolysis plant to provide process heat to the HTC process.

In Phoenixville, Pennsylvania, in the US, HTC will be used in the first municipally owned wastewater treatment in North America built by SoMax BioEnergy

In Mezzocorona (TN), Italy, the first HTC in the country was built in late 2019 by CarboREM and is in service, treating digestate from an existing anaerobic digestion plant (AD). The AD is fed with sludge coming from regional-based wineries and dairies. The slurry from the HTC plant is then separated by a centrifuge, the HTC liquid is recirculated to the AD plant to produce more biogas, and nearly 500 tons per year of hydrochar are produced. Subsequently, hydrochar is stabilized and processed by a third company as compost for the reintroduction into agriculture with a circular process.

In Relzow, Germany near Anklam (Mecklenburg-Western Pomerania) an HTC plant was officially inaugurated in the middle of November 2017 in "Innovation Park Vorpommern". AVA is also the first company in the world to establish an HTC plant on an industrial level in 2010.

In the Summer of 2016, an HTC plant for the treatment of sewage sludge was put into operation in Jining/China, to produce renewable fuel for the local coal-fired power plant. According to the manufacturer TerraNova Energy, it is in continuous operation with an annual capacity of 14.000 tons.

== See also ==
- Biomass
- Chernozem
- Climate farming (only available in German)
- Pyrogenic carbon (only available in German)

== Literature ==
- Tobias Helmut Freitag: Hydrothermale Karbonisierung. Studienarbeit, Grin, 2011, ISBN 978-3-656-07822-7.
- X. J. Cui, M. Antonietti, S. H. Yu: Structural effects of iron oxide nanoparticles and iron ions on the hydrothermal carbonization of starch and rice carbohydrates. In: Small. 2 (6): 756–759, 2006.
- S. H. Yu, X. J. Cui, L. L. Li, K. Li, B. Yu, M. Antonietti, H. Colfen: From starch to metal/carbon hybrid nanostructures: Hydrothermal metal-catalyzed carbonization. In: Advanced Materials. 16 (18): 1636, 2004.
