= Ring forming reaction =

Type of reaction in organic chemistry

A ring forming reaction or ring-closing reaction in organic chemistry is an umbrella term for a variety of reactions that introduce one or more rings into a molecule. A heterocycle forming reaction is a reaction that introduces a new heterocycle. Important classes of ring forming reactions include annulations and cycloadditions. Heterocyclic compounds are useful in spectroscopic identification of compounds, purity criteria, and investigating the molecular electronic structures.

== Named ring forming reactions ==
Named ring forming reactions include (not exhaustive):

- Azide-alkyne Huisgen cycloaddition
- Bischler–Napieralski reaction
- Bucherer carbazole synthesis
- Danheiser annulation
- Dieckmann condensation
- Diels–Alder reaction
- Feist–Benary synthesis
- Fiesselmann thiophene synthesis
- Fischer indole synthesis
- Gewald reaction
- Hantzsch pyridine synthesis
- Larock indole synthesis
- Paal–Knorr synthesis
- Pictet–Spengler reaction
- Pomeranz–Fritsch reaction
- Ring-closing metathesis
- Robinson annulation
- Skraup reaction

== See also ==
- Ring-closing reactions in Cyclic compound
