= Hantzsch pyridine synthesis =

Chemical reaction

Named after	Arthur Rudolf Hantzsch
Reaction type	Ring forming reaction

Identifiers
Organic Chemistry Portal	hantzsch-dihydropyridine-synthesis
RSC ontology ID	RXNO:0000268

The Hantzsch pyridine synthesis or Hantzsch dihydropyridine synthesis is a multi-component organic reaction between an aldehyde such as formaldehyde, 2 equivalents of a β-keto ester such as ethyl acetoacetate and a nitrogen donor such as ammonium acetate or ammonia. The initial reaction product is a dihydropyridine which can be oxidized in a subsequent step to a pyridine. The driving force for this second reaction step is aromatization. This reaction was reported in 1881 by Arthur Rudolf Hantzsch.

A 1,4-dihydropyridine dicarboxylate is also called a 1,4-DHP compound or a Hantzsch ester. These compounds are an important class of calcium channel blockers and as such commercialized in for instance nifedipine, amlodipine or nimodipine.

The reaction has been demonstrated to proceed in water as reaction solvent and with direct aromatization by ferric chloride, manganese dioxide or potassium permanganate in a one-pot synthesis.

Hantzsch reaction with ammonium acetate, ethyl acetoacetate, formaldehyde and ferric chloride

The Hantzsch dihydropyridine synthesis has been affected by microwave chemistry.

== Mechanism ==
At least five significant pathways have been proposed for the Hantzch reaction synthesis of 1,4-dihydropyridine. Low yield and unexpected products may arise under varying reactants and reaction conditions. Previous studies have tested the reactions of preformed intermediates to determine the most likely mechanism and design successful syntheses. An early study into the mechanism using ^{13}C and ^{15}N NMR indicated the intermediacy of the chalcone 6 and enamine 3. This data suggested the following route for the reaction.

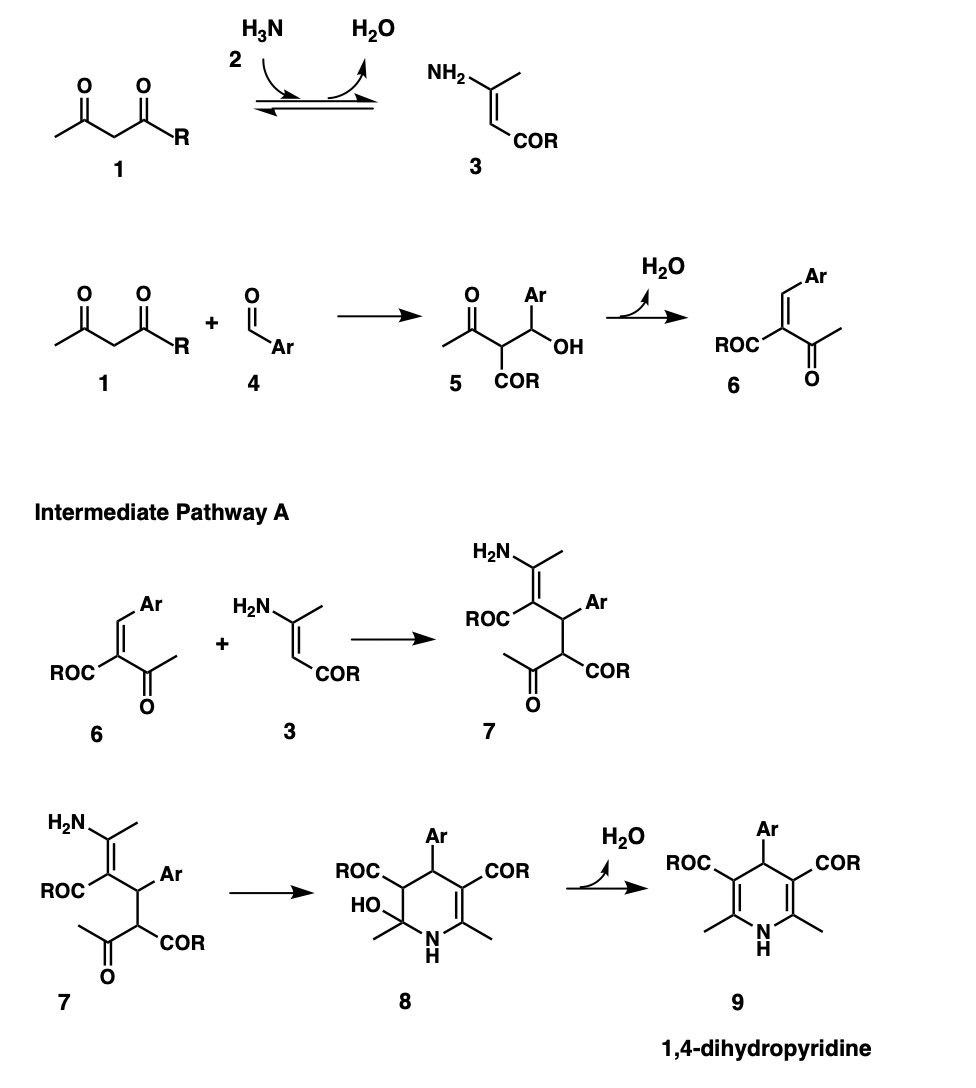

Later research using mass spectrometry monitoring with charge-tagged reactants supported intermediate pathway A as a likely route and showed evidence that the reaction followed two additional intermediate pathways which converge to precursor 7. Reagents likely influence the route taken as when the methyl group of 1 is replaced by an electron-withdrawing group, the reaction instead proceeds through a diketone intermediate.

== Optimization of reaction conditions ==
The classical method for synthesis of Hantzsch 1,4-dihydropyridines, which involves a one-pot condensation of aldehydes with ethyl acetoacetate and ammonia, have several drawbacks such as harsh reaction conditions, long reaction times, and generally low yield of products. A synthesis of 1,4-dihydropyridines in aqueous micelles catalyzed by PTSA under ultrasonic irradiation. Using condensation of benzaldehyde, ethyl acetoacetate and ammonium acetate as a model, experiments have proven that when catalyzed by p-toluenesulfonic acid (PTSA) under ultrasonic irradiation, the reaction can have a product yield of 96% in aqueous (SDS, 0.1M). The reaction had also been carried out in various solvent system, and it was discovered that the ultrasonic irradiation in aqueous micelles gave better yields than in solvents such as methanol, ethanol, THF. Using the optimized reaction conditions, a series of 1,4-dihydropyridine were synthesized, and they all have a reaction yield above 90%.

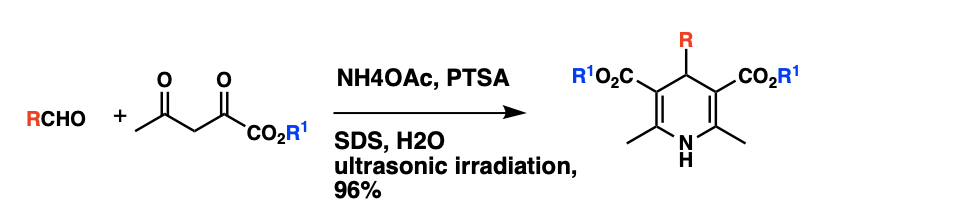

== Aromatization ==
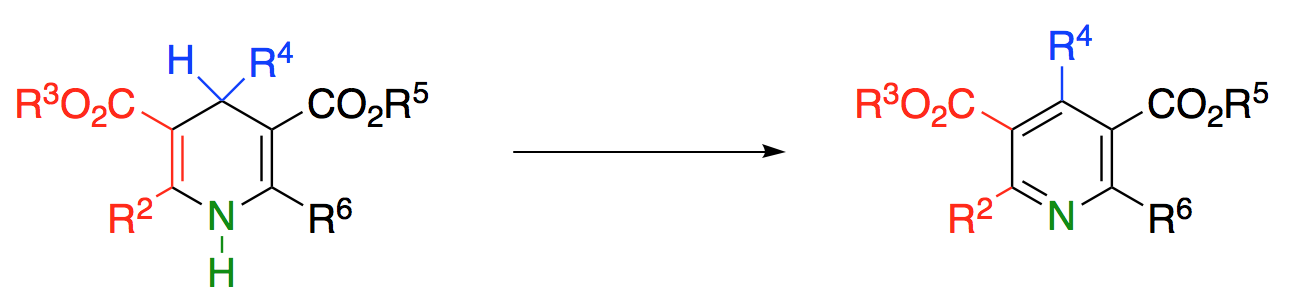

Oxidation of 1,4-DHPs accounts for one of the easiest ways of accessing pyridine derivatives. Common oxidants used to promote aromatization of 1,4-DHPs are CrO_{3}, KMnO_{4}, and HNO_{3}. However, aromatization is often accompanied by: low chemical yields, strong oxidative conditions, burdensome workups, the formation of side products, or the need of excess oxidant. As such, particular attention has been paid to developing methods of aromatization to yield pyridine derivatives under milder and efficient conditions. Such conditions include, but are not limited to: iodine in refluxing methanol, chromium dioxide(CrO_{2}), sodium chlorite, and under metal-free, photochemical conditions using both UV-light and visible light. Upon metabolism, 1,4-DHP based antihypertensive drugs undergo oxidation by way of cytochrome P-450 in the liver and are thus converted to their pyridine derivatives. As a result, particular attention has been paid to the aromatization of 1,4-DHPs as a means to understand biological systems and so as to develop new methods of accessing pyridines.

== Green chemistry ==
As a multi-component reaction, the Hantzsch pyridine synthesis is much more atom efficient with a simpler number of reaction steps than a linear-strategy synthesis. In recent years, research has looked to make this an even more environmentally friendly reaction by investigating "greener" solvents and reaction conditions. One line of study has experimented with using ionic liquids as catalysts for room temperature reactions. Ionic liquids are an easy to handle and non-toxic option to replace traditional catalysts. Additionally, this catalyst lead to a high yield at room temperature, reducing the impact of heating the reaction for an extended time. A second study used ceric ammonium nitrate (CAN) as an alternate catalyst and achieved a solvent-free room temperature reaction.

== Knoevenagel–Fries modification ==
The Knoevenagel–Fries modification allows for the synthesis of unsymmetrical pyridine compounds.

== See also ==
- Hantzsch pyrrole synthesis
