= Ethyl acetoacetate =

Ethyl ester of acetoacetic acid

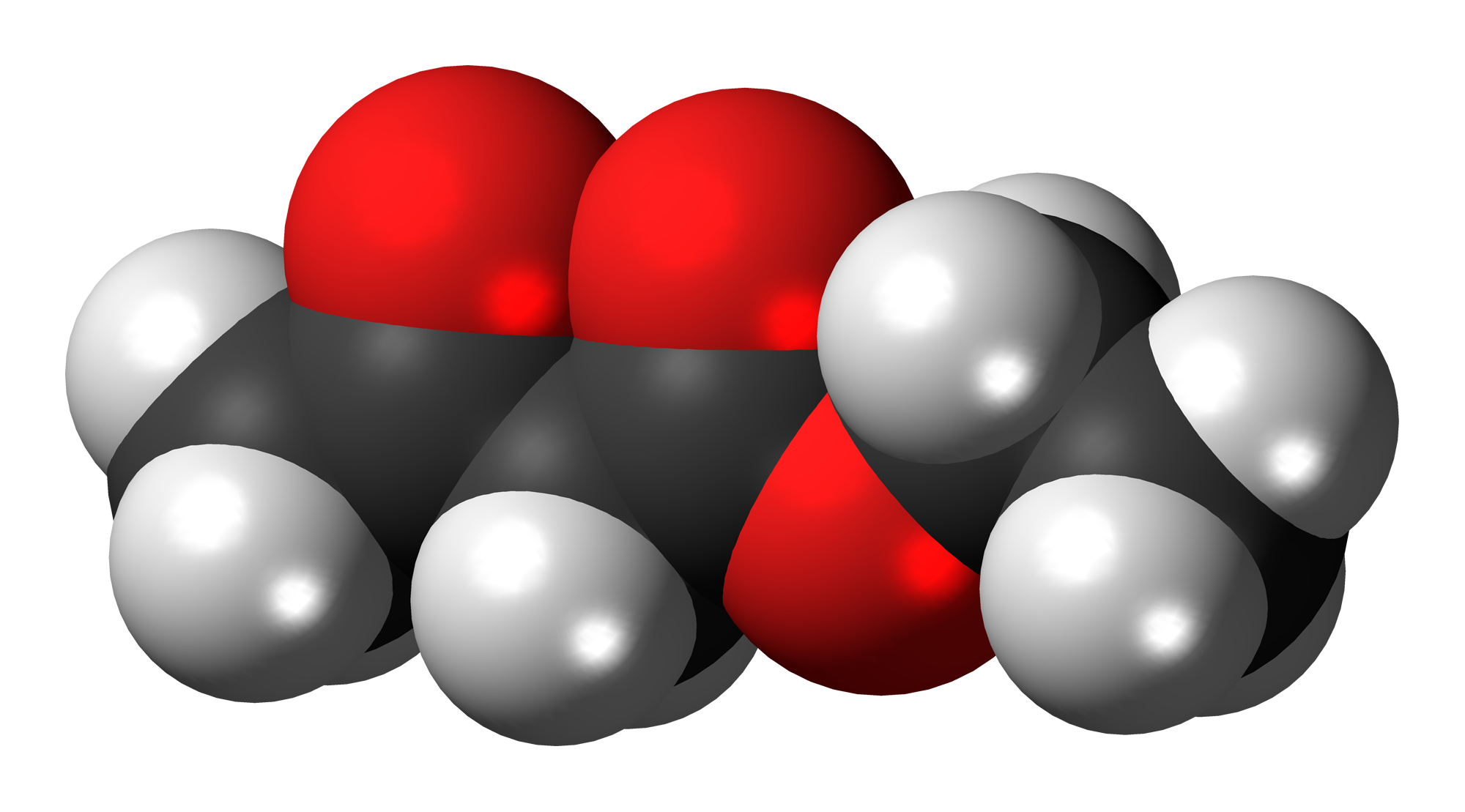

Names
- Preferred IUPAC name Ethyl 3-oxobutanoate
- Other names: Acetoacetic acid ethyl ester; Ethyl acetylacetate; 3-Oxobutanoic acid ethyl ester

Identifiers
CAS Number	141-97-9
3D model (JSmol)	Interactive image
ChEBI	CHEBI:4893
ChEMBL	ChEMBL169176
ChemSpider	13865426
ECHA InfoCard	100.005.015
EC Number	205-516-1
KEGG	C03500
PubChem CID	8868
RTECS number	AK5250000
UNII	IZP61H3TB1
UN number	1993
CompTox Dashboard (EPA)	DTXSID2027092
- InChI: InChI=1S/C6H10O3/c1-3-9-6(8)4-5(2)7/h3-4H2,1-2H3 Key: XYIBRDXRRQCHLP-UHFFFAOYSA-N; InChI=1/C6H10O3/c1-3-9-6(8)4-5(2)7/h3-4H2,1-2H3 Key: XYIBRDXRRQCHLP-UHFFFAOYAP
- SMILES: CCOC(=O)CC(=O)C

Properties
Chemical formula	C_{6}H_{10}O_{3}
Molar mass	130.14 g/mol
Appearance	Colourless liquid
Odor	Fruit or rum
Density	1.030 g/cm^{3}, liquid
Melting point	−45 °C (−49 °F; 228 K)
Boiling point	180.8 °C (357.4 °F; 453.9 K)
Solubility in water	2.86 g/100 ml (20 °C)
Acidity (pK_{a})	10.68 (in H_{2}O); 14.2 (in DMSO)
Magnetic susceptibility (χ)	−71.67×10^{−6}cm^{3}/mol
Refractive index (n_{D})	1.420

Hazards
- GHS labelling
Pictograms	(GHS07: Exclamation mark)
Signal word	Warning
Hazard statements	H319
Precautionary statements	P305+P351+P338
NFPA 704 (fire diamond)	2 2
Flash point	70 °C (158 °F; 343 K)

Related compounds
Related esters	Methyl acetoacetate; Ethyl acetate; Diethyl malonate
Related compounds	Acetone; Acetylacetone; Diketene
- Except where otherwise noted, data are given for materials in their standard state (at 25 °C [77 °F], 100 kPa). verify (what is ?) Infobox references

The organic compound ethyl acetoacetate (EAA) is the ethyl ester of acetoacetic acid. It is a colorless liquid. It is used in the production of a variety of compounds.

== Preparation ==
At large scale, ethyl acetoacetate is industrially produced by treatment of diketene with ethanol.

The small scale preparation of ethyl acetoacetate is a classic laboratory procedure. It involves Claisen condensation of ethyl acetate. Two moles of ethyl acetate condense to form one mole each of ethyl acetoacetate and ethanol.

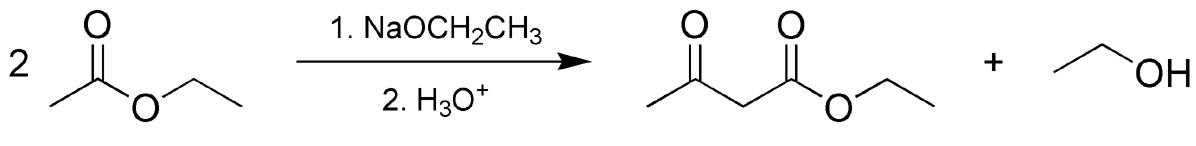
Preparation of ethyl acetoacetate

== Reactions ==
Ethyl acetoacetate is subject to keto-enol tautomerism. In the neat liquid at 33 °C, the enol consists of 8% of the total.

The enol is moderately acidic. Thus ethyl acetoacetate behaves similarly to acetylacetone:

CH_{3}C(O)CH_{2}CO_{2}C_{2}H_{5} + NaH → CH_{3}C(O)CHNaCO_{2}C_{2}H_{5} + H_{2}

The resulting carbanion undergoes nucleophilic substitution. Ethyl acetoacetate is often used in the acetoacetic ester synthesis, comparable to diethyl malonate in the malonic ester synthesis or the Knoevenagel condensation. After its alkylation and saponification, thermal decarboxylation is also possible.

The dianion of ethyl acetoacetate is also a useful building block, except that the electrophile adds to the terminal carbon. The strategy can be depicted in the following simplified form:

CH_{3}C(O)CHNaCO_{2}C_{2}H_{5} + BuLi → LiCH_{2}C(O)CHNaCO_{2}C_{2}H_{5} + BuH (Bu = butyl)

Reduction of ethyl acetoacetate gives ethyl 3-hydroxybutyrate.

Ethyl acetoacetate transesterifies to give benzyl acetoacetate via a mechanism involving acetylketene. Ethyl (and other) acetoacetates nitrosate readily with equimolar sodium nitrite in acetic acid, to afford the corresponding oximinoacetoacetate esters. A dissolving-zinc reduction of these in acetic acid in the presence of ketoesters or beta-diketones constitute the Knorr pyrrole synthesis, useful for the preparation of porphyrins.

Another similarity to acetylacetone, ethyl acetoacetate forms chelate complexes, such as Al(CH_{3}C(O)CHCO_{2}C_{2}H_{5})_{3} and the Fe(III) derivative.

== See also ==
Two ketals of ethyl acetoacetate are used in commercial fragrances.

- Fructone (CH_{3}C(O_{2}C_{2}H_{4})CH_{2}CO_{2}C_{2}H_{5}), the ethylene glycol ketal
- Fraistone (CH_{3}C(O_{2}C_{2}H_{3}CH_{3})CH_{2}CO_{2}C_{2}H_{5}), the propylene glycol ketal

== Safety and environmental considerations ==
Ethyl acetoacetate has low toxicity to animals. It is highly biodegradable.
