= Adenosine nucleosidase =

Class of enzymes

Identifiers
- EC no.: 3.2.2.7
- CAS no.: 9075-41-6

Databases
- BRENDA: enzyme data
- ExPASy: NiceZyme view
- KEGG: enzyme entry
- MetaCyc: metabolic pathway
- Rhea: reactions
- PDB structures: RCSB PDB PDBe PDBsum
- Gene Ontology: AmiGO / QuickGO
Search
- PMC: articles
- PubMed: articles
- NCBI: proteins

Adenosine nucleosidase (EC 3.2.2.7) is an enzyme that catalyzes the chemical reaction

adenosine
H_{2}O
adenine
+
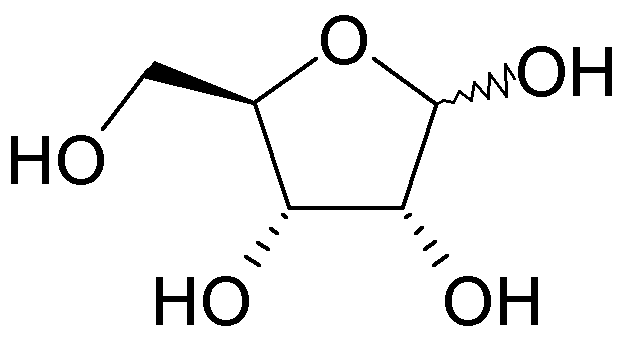
D-ribose

The enzyme characterised from Brussels sprouts hydrolyses the nucleoside, adenosine, to adenine and D-ribose. The enzyme is found in many plants as it is involved in cytokinin biosynthesis.

This enzyme is a hydrolase, specifically a glycosylase that hydrolyses N-glycosyl compounds. The systematic name of this enzyme class is adenosine ribohydrolase. Other names in common use include adenosinase, N-ribosyladenine ribohydrolase, adenosine hydrolase, and ANase.

== See also ==
- Purine nucleosidase, which is a more general enzyme that also has this activity
