= Fischer indole synthesis =

Chemical reaction

Named after	Hermann Emil Fischer
Reaction type	Ring forming reaction

Identifiers
Organic Chemistry Portal	fischer-indole-synthesis
RSC ontology ID	RXNO:0000064

The Fischer indole synthesis is a chemical reaction that produces the aromatic heterocycle indole from a (substituted) phenylhydrazine and an aldehyde or ketone under acidic conditions. The reaction was discovered in 1883 by Emil Fischer. Anti-migraine drugs of the triptan class are often synthesized by this method.

The Fischer indole synthesis

This reaction can be catalyzed by Brønsted acids, such as HCl, H_{2}SO_{4}, polyphosphoric acid, and p-toluenesulfonic acid, or Lewis acids, such as boron trifluoride, zinc chloride, and aluminium chloride.

Several reviews have been published.

== Reaction mechanism ==
The reaction of a (substituted) phenylhydrazine with a carbonyl (aldehyde or ketone) initially forms a phenylhydrazone, which tautomerizes to the respective enamine (or 'ene-hydrazine'). A [3,3]-sigmatropic rearrangement occurs producing a diimine. The resulting diimine undergoes a ring-closing reaction to form a cyclic aminall, returning the six-membered ring to its aromatic state. Catalyzed by acid, the aminal undergoes an elimination of NH_{3}, resulting in the energetically favorable pyrrole-like aromatic ring and completing the indole structure. The mechanism was first proposed by Gertrude Maud Robinson and Robert Robinson as part of their development of the Piloty–Robinson pyrrole synthesis.

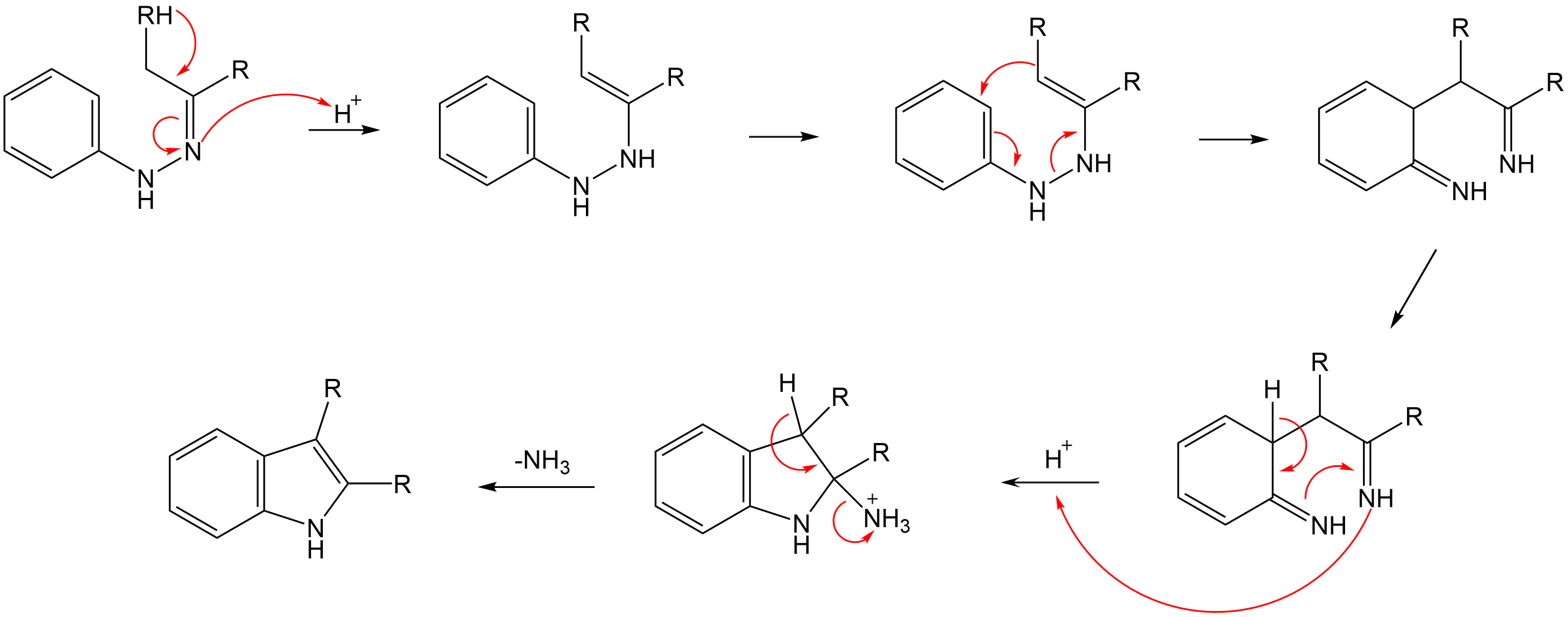
The mechanism of the Fischer indole synthesis

Isotopic labelling studies show that the aryl nitrogen (N1) of the starting phenylhydrazine is incorporated into the resulting indole.

== Buchwald modification ==
Via a palladium-catalyzed reaction, the Fischer indole synthesis can be effected by cross-coupling aryl bromides and hydrazones. This result supports the previously proposed intermediacy as hydrazone intermediates in the classical Fischer indole synthesis. These N-arylhydrazones undergo exchange with other ketones, expanding the scope of this method.

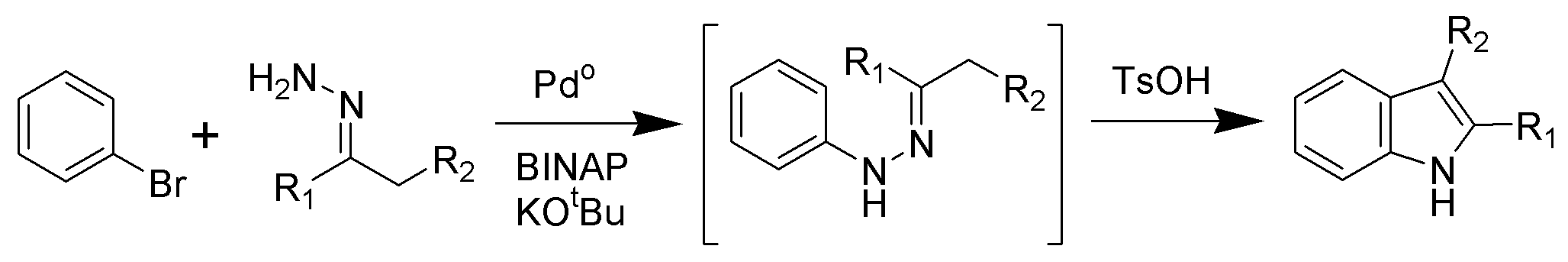
The Buchwald modification of the Fischer indole synthesis

== Application ==
- A variant of the Fischer indolization reaction, termed the interrupted Fischer indolization by Garg and coworkers, has been used in the total synthesis of akuammiline natural products. The method has also been used in medicinal chemistry.
- Indometacin preparation.
- Triptan synthesis
- Iprindole synthesis (phenylhydrazine + suberone → 2,3-Cycloheptenoindole).

== See also ==
- Bartoli indole synthesis
- Gassman indole synthesis
- Japp–Klingemann reaction
- Larock indole synthesis
- Leimgruber–Batcho indole synthesis
- Madelung synthesis
- Nenitzescu indole synthesis
- Reissert indole synthesis
