= Ribose 1-dehydrogenase (NADP+) =

ribose 1-dehydrogenase (NADP^{+})

Identifiers
- EC no.: 1.1.1.115
- CAS no.: 37250-46-7

Databases
- IntEnz: IntEnz view
- BRENDA: BRENDA entry
- ExPASy: NiceZyme view
- KEGG: KEGG entry
- MetaCyc: metabolic pathway
- PRIAM: profile
- PDB structures: RCSB PDB PDBe PDBsum
- Gene Ontology: AmiGO / QuickGO
Search
- PMC: articles
- PubMed: articles
- NCBI: proteins

In enzymology, ribose 1-dehydrogenase (NADP^{+}) (EC 1.1.1.115) is an enzyme that catalyzes the chemical reaction

D-ribose
+ NADP^{+}
H_{2}O
H^{+}
H_{2}O
H^{+}
D-ribonic acid
+ NADPH

The three substrates of this enzyme are D-ribose, oxidised nicotinamide adenine dinucleotide phosphate (NADP^{+}), and water. Its products are D-ribonic acid, reduced NADPH, and a proton.

This enzyme belongs to the family of oxidoreductases, specifically those acting on the CH-OH group of donor with NAD^{+} or NADP^{+} as acceptor. The systematic name of this enzyme class is D-ribose:NADP^{+} 1-oxidoreductase. Other names in common use include D-ribose dehydrogenase (NADP^{+}), NADP^{+}-pentose-dehydrogenase, and ribose 1-dehydrogenase (NADP^{+}).
