= Piloty–Robinson pyrrole synthesis =

In organic chemistry, the Piloty–Robinson pyrrole synthesis is the acid-catalyzed conversion of an azine into a pyrrole.

The azine can be formed by condensing two aldehydes or ketones with hydrazine to give a two-step process.

The reaction is named for Oskar Piloty, Gertrude Maud Robinson, and Robert Robinson.

== Reaction mechanism ==
The pyrrole formation involves tautomerization of each imine to give an enamine, the two of which together then undergo a [3,3]-sigmatropic rearrangement to give a new bis-imine. These imines again tautomerize to give enamines, which undergo a ring-closing reaction with loss of ammonia.

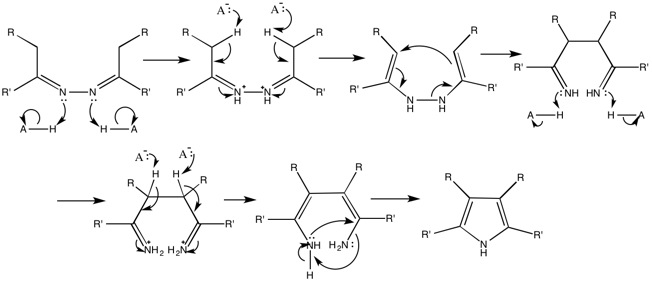
The mechanism for the Piloty-Robinson Pyrrole Synthesis suggested by Gertrude and Robert Robinson.

The mechanism is analogous to that of the Fischer indole synthesis, originally proposed by the Robinsons during their development of their pyrrole synthesis method.

== Drawbacks ==
There are, however, a few problems with some syntheses. The Piloty-Robinson reaction competes with the formation of pyrazoline when the reactant is an aliphatic azine derived from a ketone. Also, under high temperatures and highly acidic solutions, azines derived from aldehydes are not stable. This prevents the formation of 2,5-disubstituted pyrroles (where R=H) using this method.

While the pyrroles produced by the Piloty-Robinson Synthesis are often very useful, the reaction itself is not always favorable because it requires high temperatures and long reaction times in addition to the problems mentioned above, the yield is often low or moderate. Modern methods have alleviated some of these concerns.

== Variations ==
=== Microwave irradiation ===
Use of microwave radiation rather than simple heating decreases the time necessary for the reaction from around 3 days to 30–60 minutes and can improve the yield.ref name=milgram/>

In one modification, propionaldehyde is treated first with hydrazine and then with benzoyl chloride at high temperatures and assisted by microwave irradiation:

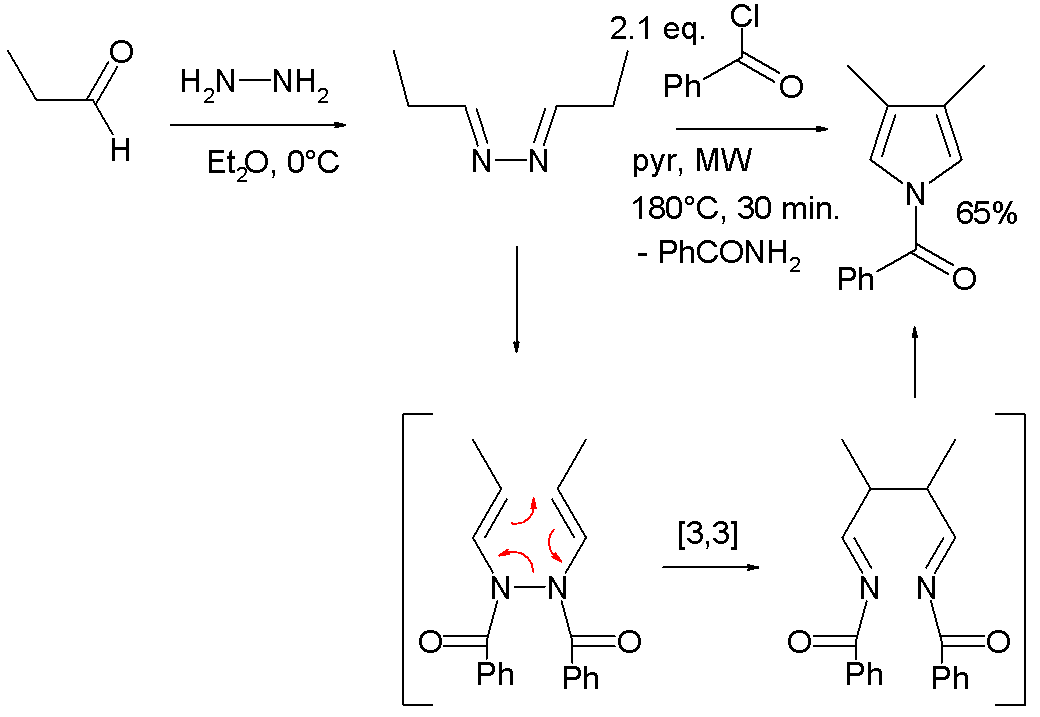
Piloty–Robinson reaction

=== Solid-supported ===
Solid-supported syntheses offer an easier and more efficient workup and purification

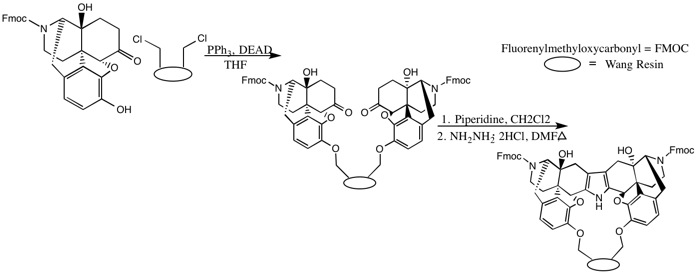
Example of a solid-supported Piloty–Robinson synthesis
