= Bioretrosynthesis =

Technique for synthesizing organic chemicals

Bioretrosynthesis is a technique for synthesizing organic chemicals from inexpensive precursors and evolved enzymes. The technique builds on the retro-evolution hypothesis proposed in 1945 by geneticist Norman Horowitz.

== Technique ==
The technique works backwards from the target to identify a precursor molecule and an enzyme that converts it into the target, and then a second precursor that can produce the first and so on until a simple, inexpensive molecule becomes the beginning of the series. For each precursor, the enzyme is evolved using induced mutations and natural selection to produce a more productive version. The evolutionary process can be repeated over multiple generations until acceptable productivity is achieved. The process does not require high temperature, high pressure, the use of exotic catalysts or other elements that can increase costs. The enzyme "optimizations" that increase the production of one precursor from another are cumulative in that the same precursor productivity improvements can potentially be leveraged across multiple target molecules.

== Didanosine ==
In 2014 the technique was used to produce the HIV drug didanosine: a simpler molecule was identified that can be converted into didanosine when subjected to a specific chemical transformation in the presence of a specific enzyme. The gene that creates the enzyme was then "copied", adding random mutations to each copy using ribokinase engineering. The mutant genes were inserted into Escherichia coli bacteria and used to produce (now-mutant) enzymes. The enzymes were then mixed with the precursor and the mutant enzymes that produced the greatest amount of didanosine were retained and replicated. One mutant stimulated a 50x increase in didanosine production. The first step was repeated, using the first precursor in place of didanosine, finding a yet simpler precursor and an enzyme to produce it. One mutated enzyme produced a 9,500x increase in nucleoside production. A third retrogression allowed them to start with the simple and inexpensive sugar named dideoxyribose and produce didanosine in a three-step sequence.
