= Gertrude Maud Robinson =

British chemist

- Born: Gertrude Maud Walsh; 6 February 1886; Winsford, Cheshire, England
- Died: 1 March 1954 (aged 68); Oxfordshire, England
- Education: Owens College
- Spouse: Robert Robinson
- Scientific career
- Fields: Organic chemistry

Gertrude Maud Robinson (née Walsh; 1886–1954) was an influential British organic chemist most famous for her work on plant pigments; the Piloty–Robinson pyrrole synthesis, which is named for her; her syntheses of fatty acids; and her synthesis of δ-hexenolactone, the first synthetic molecule with the character of penicillin.

== Biography ==
Robinson was born on 6 February 1886 in Winsford, Cheshire.

After attending Verdin Secondary School, she was granted her B. Sc. in 1907 and M. Sc. in 1908 from Owens College. She then researched at the University of Manchester under Chaim Weizmann, who later became the first president of Israel, and taught chemistry at the Manchester High School for Girls.

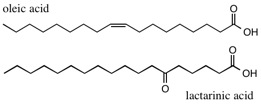

In 1912 she married Robert Robinson, who later won the 1947 Nobel Prize and with whom she coauthored many papers, and moved to the position of an unpaid demonstrator at the University of Sydney before briefly going to the St. Andrews in Scotland and University College in London. She worked on the syntheses of saturated and unsaturated fatty acids and was the first to synthesize oleic acid and lactarinic acid. Her methods led to her synthesis of fatty acids with the greatest molecular weights of the time (specifically, tricontanoic and 13-oxodotetracontanoic acids).

Tetraphenylpyrrole

She also independently suggested the asymmetric structure of aromatic azoxy compounds and, with her husband, postulated a mechanism for the Fischer indole synthesis. Based on this mechanism and working off the pyrrole syntheses of Oskar Piloty, the couple provided a method for synthesizing tetraphenylpyrrole. The Piloty–Robinson pyrrole synthesis is now a known name reaction.

After moving to the University of Oxford, Gertrude Robinson began studying plant pigments and published extensively on anthocyanins with her husband. She was the first to observe that the color of a plant’s pigment was not related to the pH of its sap and she pioneered work in leucoanthocyanins. Additionally, she was the first to synthesize δ-hexenolactone, a molecule similar to penicillin that had its antibiotic properties.

Besides her work as a chemist, Gertrude Robinson had two children, Marion in 1921 and Michael in 1926. She was an avid mountain climber, a prolific traveler, and a frequent hostess. (Note: The British Association for the Advancement of Science held a Sectional Dinner to which, according to tradition, only men were invited. Gertrude Robinson hosted “a dinner party at the same time as the Sectional Dinner, in the same hotel and with the same menu, to which she invited other women chemists as well as wives of the sectional officers and of other prominent members.” Following this event, all dinners of the British Association have been open to women.) Perhaps inspiring her work on plant pigments, she and her husband also kept a garden for many years.

She and died of a heart attack on 1 March 1954, in Oxfordshire, at age 68.

== Plant genetics ==
=== Anthocyanins and copigments ===
Flowers, fruits, and leaves get their pigments from anthocyanins and copigments (such as tannins and flavonols). The combinations provide the exact colors of various plants at different stages of development. The Robinsons found that, at different ratios of anthocyanins to copigments, the copigments had different effects and they postulated that this was due to the copigments breaking up the anthocyanin complexes, which they observed when they were in solution together. (Note: The Robinsons, who lacked a machine with which to extract pigments, instead would cover the relevant plants with boards and then drive back and forth over them.) They studied these pigments by comparing color distributions in immiscible solutions after reactions with alkalis or ferric chloride.

=== Leucoanthocyanins ===
The Robinsons investigated the structure of leucoanthocyanins, colorless molecules that generate anthocyanidins and are present in most plants. Otto Rosenheim simultaneously discovered leucoanthocyanins and he coined the term. Leucoanthocyanins occur in more locations (wood, bark, nutshells, flowers, fruits) than normal anthocyanins.

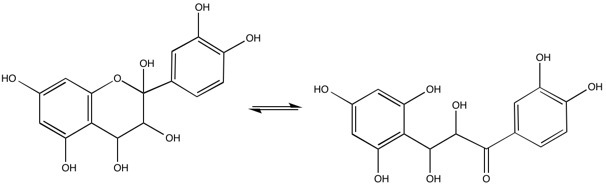
The precursor to cyanidin chloride (an anthocyanidin) and its tautomer

== Piloty–Robinson pyrrole synthesis ==
The Piloty–Robinson pyrrole synthesis, originally solely named after Piloty, had the Robinson name added to it due to their work on the mechanism. While it is unclear which Robinson the synthesis is technically named after, the paper on the topic was authored by both Gertrude and Robert. This reaction is used to convert azines to 3,4-disubstituted pyrroles.

The conversion of azines to 3,4-disubstituted pyrroles using the Piloty-Robinson pyrrole synthesis

The Robinsons's paper in particular synthesized tetraphenylpyrrole:

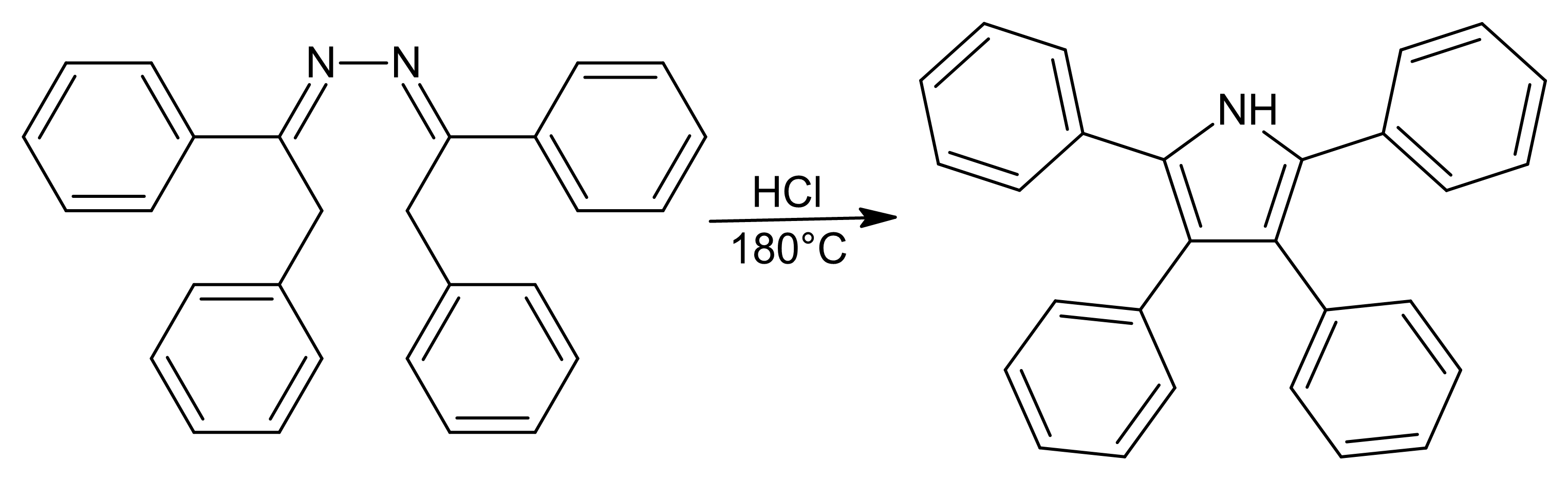
Example of the Robinsons' synthesis of tetraphenylpyrrole

== Fischer Indole mechanism ==
The Robinsons disproved many of the prevailing theories about the Fischer indole mechanism by showing that the reaction went unperturbed in the presence of other aromatic amines such as p-toluidine. This is the mechanism they suggested (where hydrogen shifts may also be interpreted as hydrogen exchanges in acid).

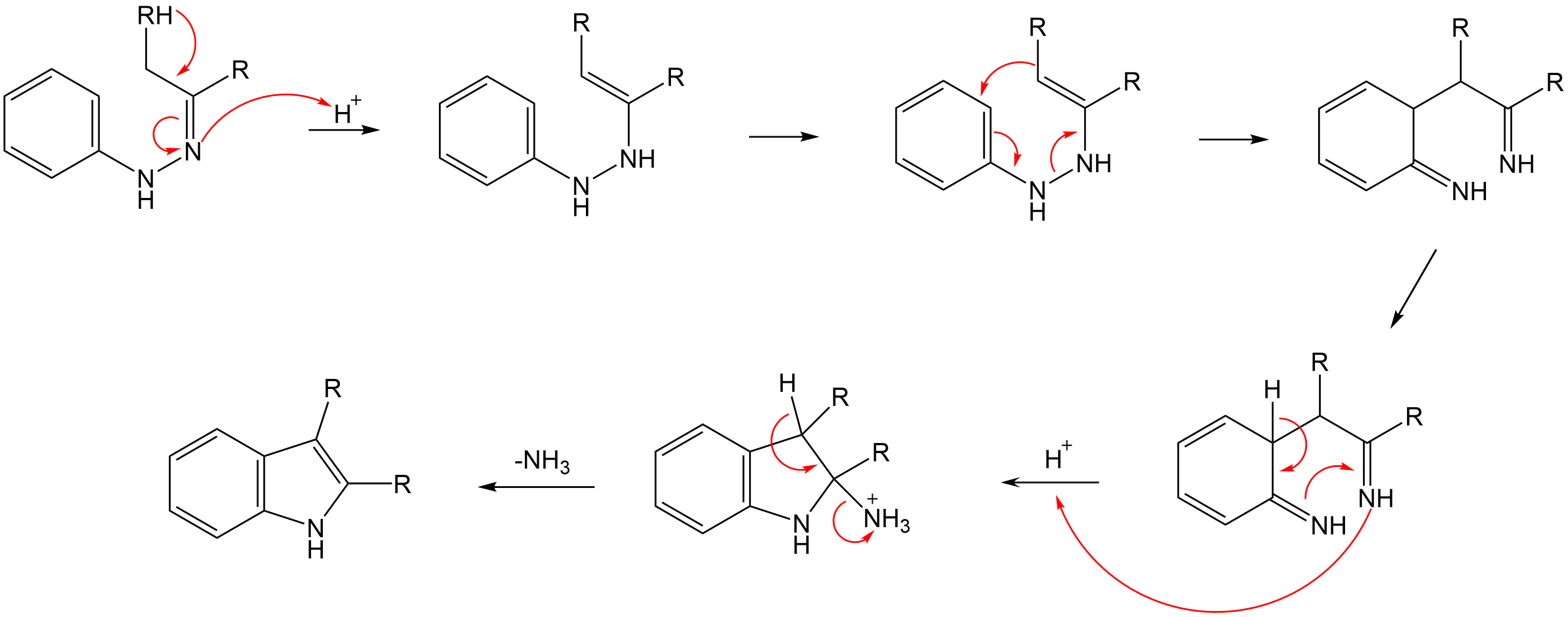
The mechanism of the Fischer indole synthesis

== Saturated and unsaturated fatty acids ==
=== Methods of synthesis of higher fatty acids ===
One of the drawbacks of the Robinsons’ methods for the synthesis of fatty acids are the low yields due to the recoveries of a significant portion of the dialdehyde. The justification by Gertrude Robinson for this low yield was that the aldehyde intermediate was a weaker acid than acetic acid, which was removed during a step in the hydrolysis. While she did not solve this problem, she did improve the yield and decrease the dialdehyde recovered by “the acylation of a substituted ethyl acetoacetate by the group related to the weakest possible acid”.

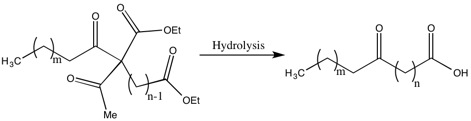
Robinsons synthesis of higher fatty acids

One example of this is the synthesis of 10-ketotridecoic acid via 13-diketopalmitic acid, which is an important acid because, with reduction and dehydration, it becomes the molecule that is an active ovarian hormone.

Gertrude Robinson, using her methods for the synthesis of higher fatty acids, synthesized melissic acid (n-triacontanoic acid), and 13-oxodotetracontanoic acid.

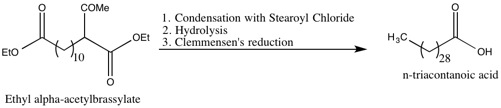
Gertrude Robinson's synthesis of n-triacontanoic acid

=== Oleic acid ===
The Robinsons identified the location of the double bond in oleic acid as part of their synthesis of it and related keto-acids.

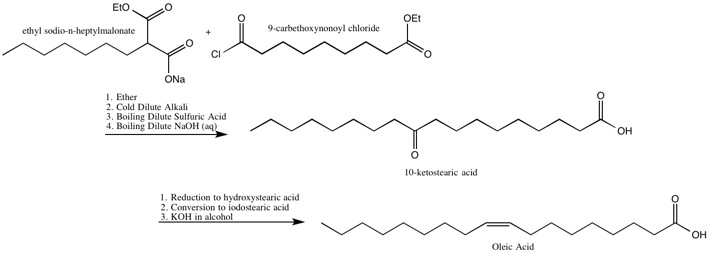
The Robinsons' synthesis of oleic acid

=== Lactarinic acid ===
Lactarinic acid, isolated from fungi of the Lactarius genus, was shown to contain a ketostearic acid. The Robinsons showed that this was in fact 6-ketostearic acid by doing a Beckmann Transformation on the oxime of lactarinic acid. They then synthesized 6-ketostearic acid via a reaction of ethyl sodio-2-acetyl-n-tridecoate and 5-carbethoxyvaleryl chloride and then hydrolysis to prove the structure of lactarinic acid.
