= Push–pull olefin =

A push-pull olefin is a type of olefin characterized by an electron-withdrawing substituent on one side of the double bond and an electron-donating substituent on the other side. This makes the pi bond very polarized. The rotational barrier for a push-pull olefin is lower than that of an ordinary olefin and this makes it an interesting candidate for a molecular switch, for instance azobenzenes. A push-pull configuration also helps to stabilize the double bond because the carbon-carbon bond has considerably less double bond character. For instance, cyclobutadiene is a very unstable molecule but with both olefinic bonds in push-pull configuration (two ester substituents and two tertiary amine substituents) the molecule is stable indeed.

== See also ==
- Leimgruber–Batcho indole synthesis
- Application of push–pull olefins in molecular logic gates
