= Purine nucleosidase =

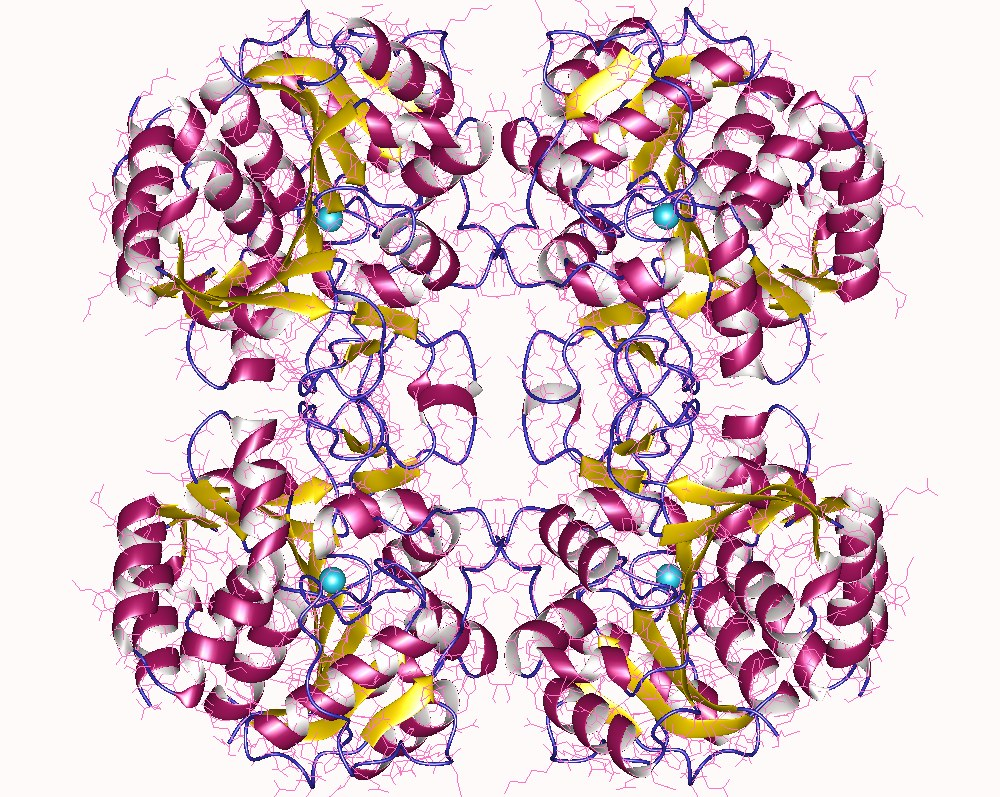
- Purine nucleosidase tetramer, Saccharolobus solfataricus

Identifiers
- EC no.: 3.2.2.1
- CAS no.: 9025-44-9

Databases
- BRENDA: enzyme data
- ExPASy: NiceZyme view
- KEGG: enzyme entry
- MetaCyc: metabolic pathway
- Rhea: reactions
- PDB structures: RCSB PDB PDBe PDBsum
- Gene Ontology: AmiGO / QuickGO
Search
- PMC: articles
- PubMed: articles
- NCBI: proteins

Purine nucleosidase (EC 3.2.2.1) is an enzyme that catalyzes the general chemical reaction

a purine nucleoside + H_{2}O $\rightleftharpoons$ a purine base + D-ribose

For example, the enzyme hydrolyses adenosine to adenine and D-ribose:

adenosine
H_{2}O
adenine
+
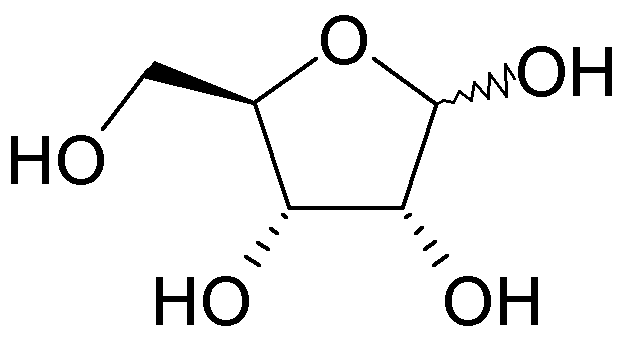
D-ribose

The enzyme occurs in a wide range of organisms, and its mechanism of action has been studied, showing that water acts as a general acid to protonate the departing nucleobase anion. Purine nucleosidases have been studied as a way to alleviate hyperuricemia.

The enzyme is a hydrolase, specifically a glycosylase that hydrolyses N-glycosyl compounds. The systematic name of this enzyme class is purine-nucleoside ribohydrolase. Other names in use include nucleosidase, purine beta-ribosidase, purine nucleoside hydrolase, purine ribonucleosidase, ribonucleoside hydrolase, nucleoside hydrolase, N-ribosyl purine ribohydrolase, nucleosidase g, N-D-ribosylpurine ribohydrolase, inosine-adenosine-guanosine preferring nucleoside hydrolase, purine-specific nucleoside N-ribohydrolase, IAG-nucleoside hydrolase, and IAG-NH.

== Structural studies ==
As of late 2007, 11 structures have been solved for this class of enzymes, with PDB accession codes PDB: 1EZR, PDB: 1HOZ, PDB: 1HP0, PDB: 1KIC, PDB: 1KIE, PDB: 1MAS, PDB: 1R4F, PDB: 2C40, PDB: 2FF1, PDB: 2FF2, and PDB: 2MAS.
