= Bartoli indole synthesis =

Chemical reaction

| Named after | Giuseppe Bartoli |
| Reaction type | Ring forming reaction |

Identifiers
| RSC ontology ID | RXNO:0000494 |

The Bartoli indole synthesis (also called the Bartoli reaction) is the chemical reaction of ortho-substituted nitroarenes and nitrosoarenes with vinyl Grignard reagents to form substituted indoles.

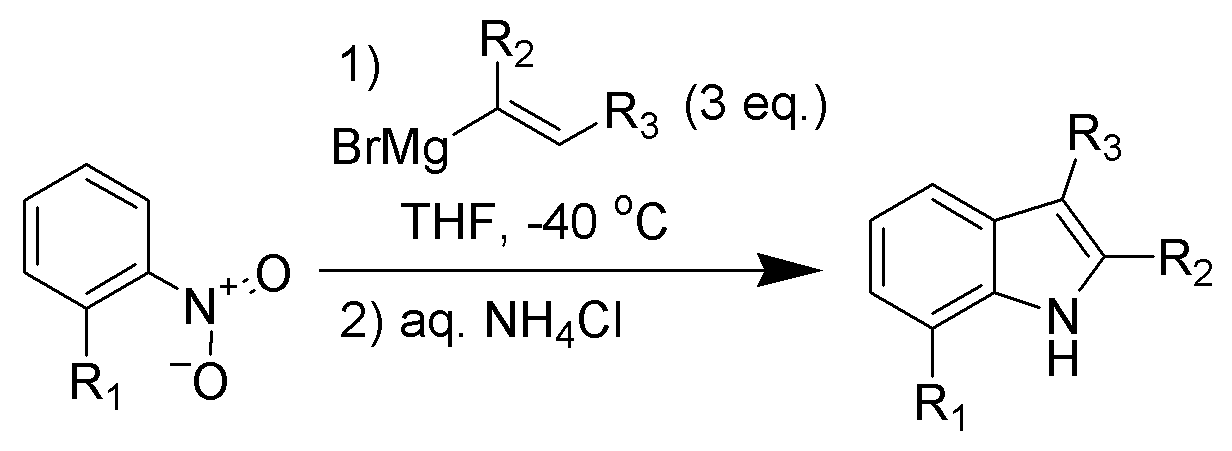
The Bartoli indole synthesis

The reaction is often unsuccessful without substitution ortho to the nitro group, with bulkier ortho substituents usually resulting in higher yields for the reaction. The steric bulk of the ortho group assists in the [3,3]-sigmatropic rearrangement required for product formation. Three equivalents of the vinyl Grignard reagent are necessary for the reaction to achieve full conversion when performed on nitroarenes, and only two equivalents when performed on nitrosoarenes.

This method has become one of the shortest and most flexible routes to 7-substituted indoles. The Leimgruber-Batcho indole synthesis gives similar flexibility and regiospecificity to indole derivatives. One advantage of the Bartoli indole synthesis is the ability to produce indoles substituted on both the carbocyclic ring and the pyrrole ring, which is difficult to do with the Leimgruber-Batcho indole synthesis.

== Reaction mechanism ==
The reaction mechanism of the Bartoli indole synthesis is illustrated below using o-nitrotoluene (1) and propenyl Grignard (2) to form 3,7-dimethylindole (13).

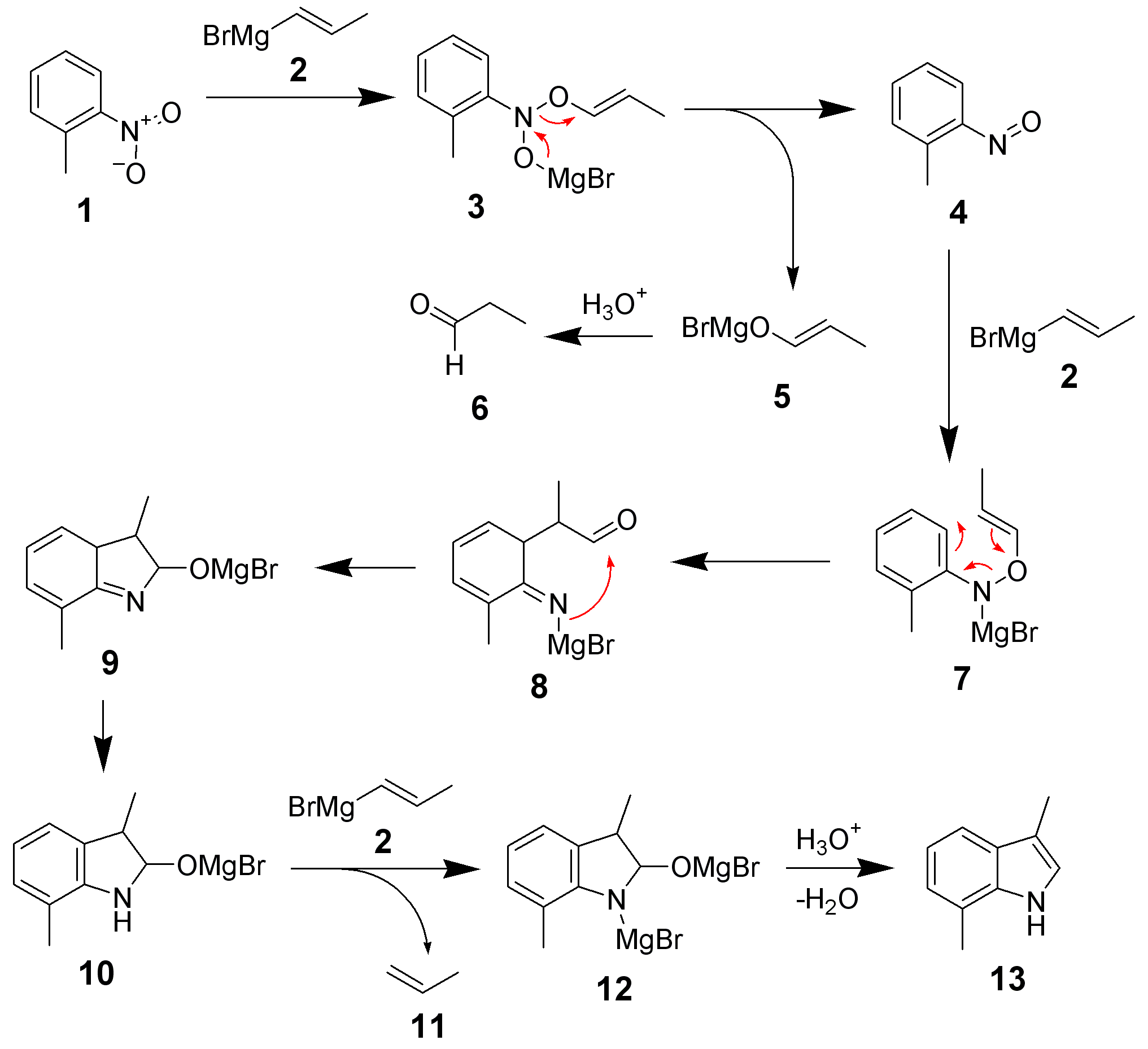
The mechanism of the Bartoli indole synthesis

The mechanism begins by the addition of the Grignard reagent (2) onto the nitroarene (1) to form intermediate 3. Intermediate 3 spontaneously decomposes to form a nitrosoarene (4) and a magnesium salt (5). (Upon reaction workup, the magnesium salt will liberate a carbonyl compound (6).) Reaction of the nitrosoarene (4) with a second equivalent of the Grignard reagent (2) forms intermediate 7. The steric bulk of the ortho group causes a [3,3]-sigmatropic rearrangement forming the intermediate 8. Cyclization and tautomerization give intermediate 10, which will react with a third equivalent of the Grignard reagent (2) to give a dimagnesium indole salt (12). Reaction workup eliminates water and gives the final desired indole (13).

Therefore, three equivalents of the Grignard reagent are necessary, as one equivalent becomes carbonyl compound 6, one equivalent deprotonates 10 forming an alkene (11), and one equivalent gets incorporated into the indole ring.

The nitroso intermediate (4) has been isolated from the reaction. Additionally, reaction of the nitroso intermediate (4) with two equivalents of the Grignard reagent produces the expected indole.

The scope of the reaction includes substituted pyridines which can be used to make 4-azaindoles(left) and 6-azaindoles(right).

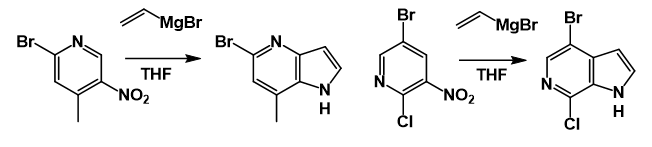

== Variations ==
=== Dobbs modification ===
Adrian Dobbs greatly enhanced the scope of the Bartoli indole synthesis by using an ortho-bromine as a directing group, which is subsequently removed by AIBN and tributyltin hydride.

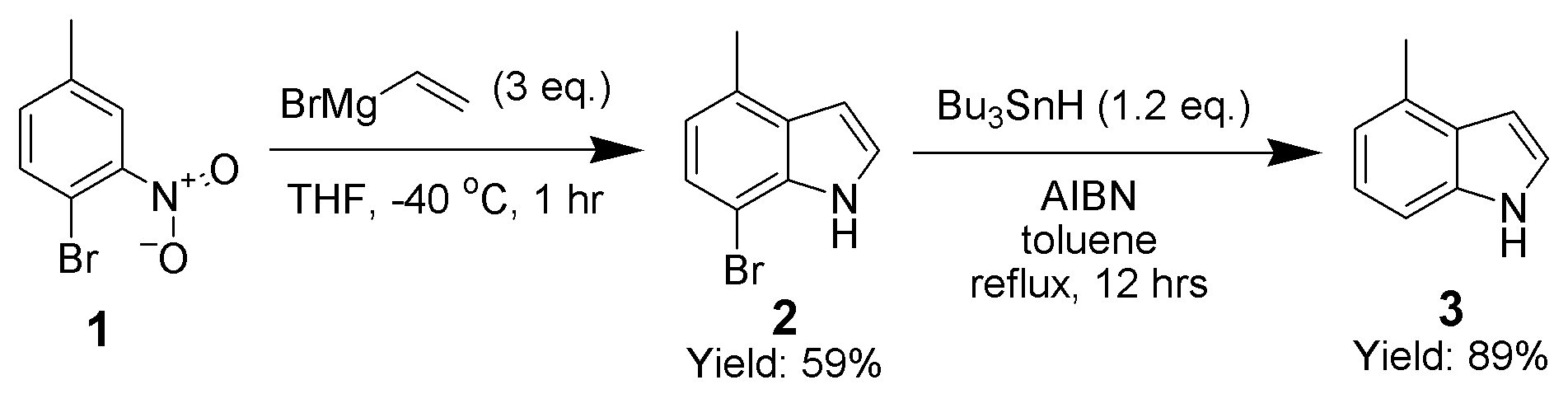
The Dobbs modification of the Bartoli indole synthesis

The synthesis of 4-methylindole (3) highlights the ability of this technique to produce highly substituted indoles.

== See also ==
- Fischer indole synthesis
