= Leimgruber–Batcho indole synthesis =

Chemical reaction

The Leimgruber–Batcho indole synthesis is a series of organic reactions that produce indoles from o-nitrotoluenes 1. The first step is the formation of an enamine 2 using N,N-dimethylformamide, dimethyl acetal and pyrrolidine. The desired indole 3 is then formed in a second step by reductive cyclisation.

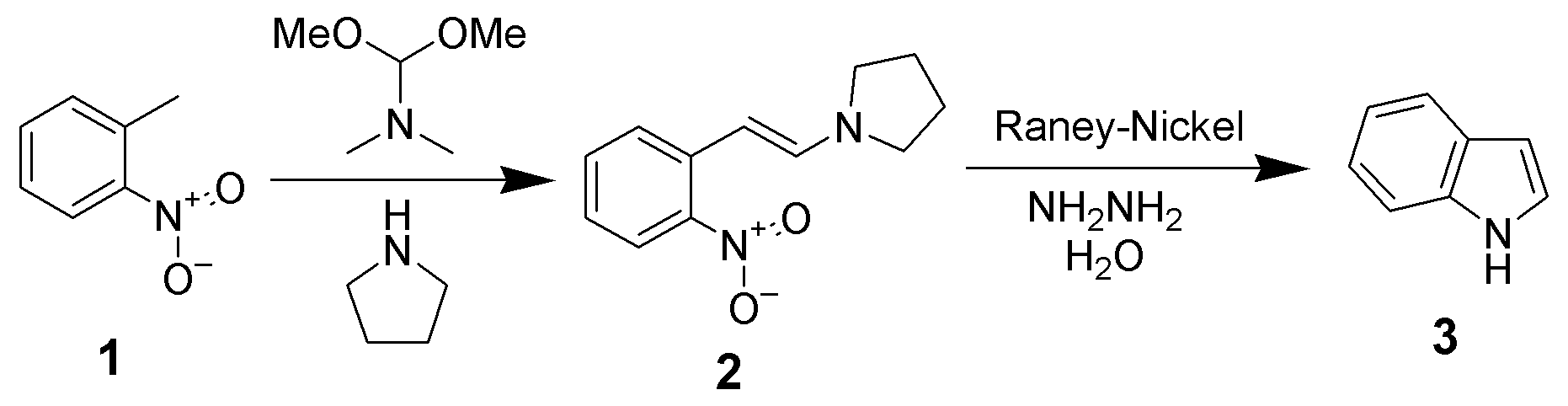
The Leimgruber-Batcho indole synthesis

In the above scheme, the reductive cyclisation is affected by Raney nickel and hydrazine. Palladium-on-carbon and hydrogen, stannous chloride, sodium hydrosulfite, or iron in acetic acid are also effective reducing agents.

== Reaction mechanism ==
In the initial enamine formation, dimethylamine (a gas) is displaced by pyrrolidine from the dimethylformamide dimethylacetal, producing a more reactive reagent. The mildly acidic hydrogens of the methyl group in the nitrotoluene can be deprotonated under the basic conditions, and the resultant carbanion attacks to produce the enamine shown, with loss of methanol. The sequence can also be performed without pyrrolidine, via the N,N-dimethyl enamine, though reaction times may be much longer in some cases. In the second step the nitro group is reduced to -NH_{2} using hydrogen and a Raney nickel catalyst, followed by cyclisation then elimination of the pyrrolidine. The hydrogen is often generated in situ by the spontaneous decomposition of hydrazine hydrate to H_{2} and N_{2} in the presence of the nickel.

The reaction is a good example of a reaction that was widely used in industry before any procedures were published in the mainstream scientific literature. Many indoles are pharmacologically active, so a good indole synthesis is important for the pharmaceutical industry. The process has become a popular alternative to the Fischer indole synthesis because many starting ortho-nitrotoluenes are commercially available or easily made. In addition, the reactions proceed in high chemical yield under mild conditions.

The intermediate enamines are electronically related to push–pull olefins, having an electron-withdrawing nitro group conjugated to an electron-donating group. The extended conjugation means that these compounds are usually an intense red color.

== Variations ==
=== Dinitrostyrene reductive cyclization ===
The reductive cyclization of dinitrostyrenes (2) has proven itself effective when other more common methods have failed.

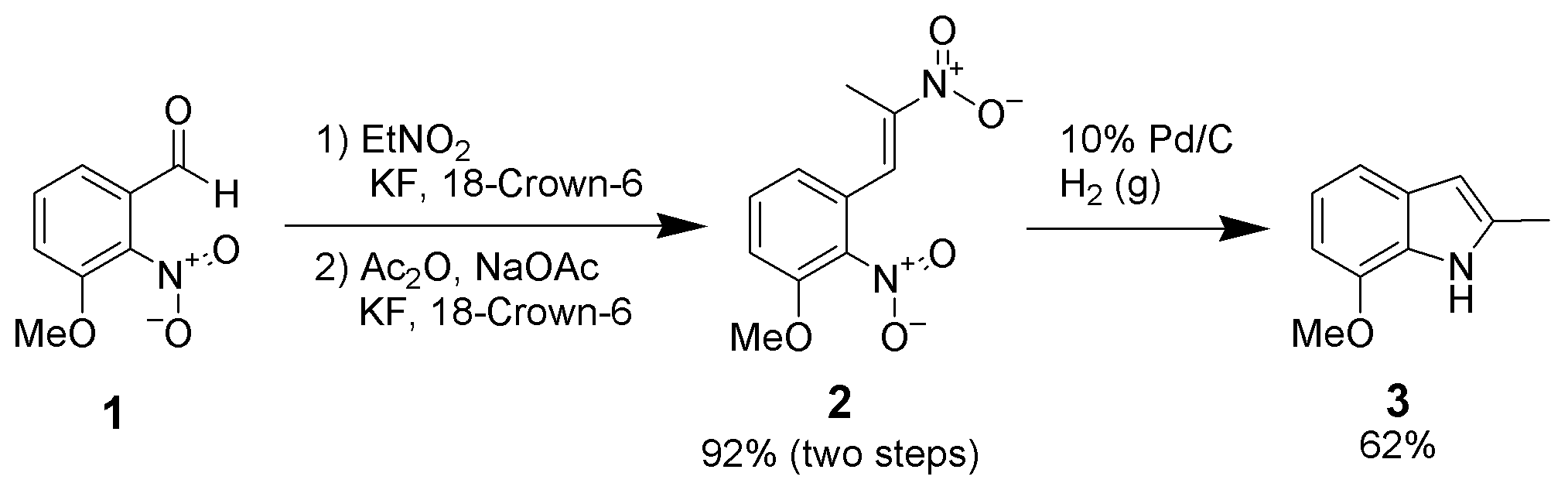
An example of a dinitrostyrene reductive cyclization

Most of the standard reduction methods listed above are successful with this reaction.

== See also ==
- Bartoli indole synthesis
- Fischer indole synthesis
- Reissert indole synthesis
