= Reissert indole synthesis =

Series of chemical reactions

Named after	Arnold Reissert
Reaction type	Ring forming reaction

The Reissert indole synthesis is a series of chemical reactions designed to synthesize indole or substituted-indoles (4 and 5) from ortho-nitrotoluene 1 and diethyl oxalate 2.

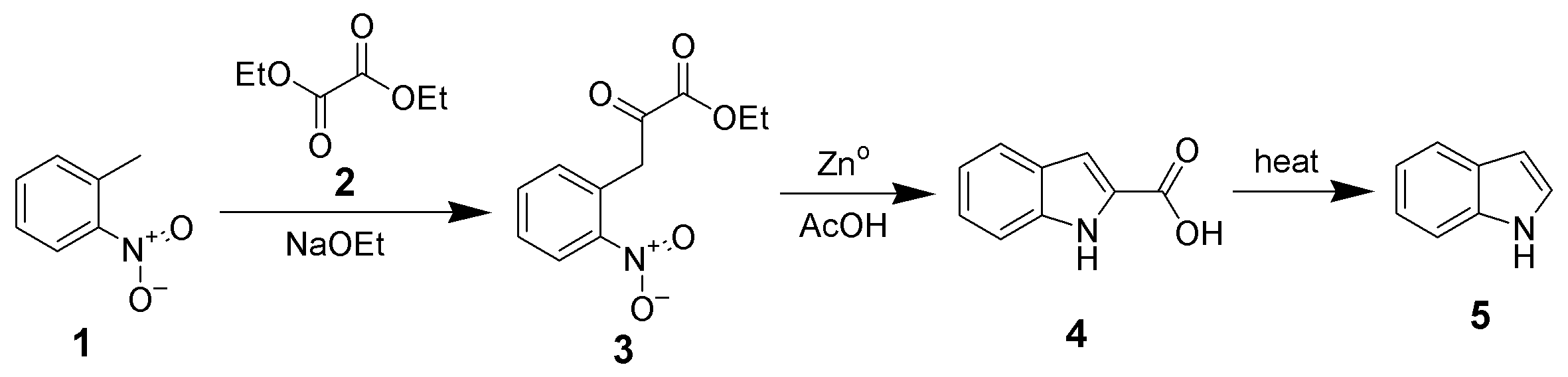
The Reissert indole synthesis

Potassium ethoxide has been shown to give better results than sodium ethoxide.

== Reaction mechanism ==
The first step of the synthesis is the condensation of o-nitrotoluene 1 with a diethyl oxalate 2 to give ethyl o-nitrophenylpyruvate 3. The reductive cyclization of 3 with zinc in acetic acid gives indole-2-carboxylic acid 4. If desired, 4 can be decarboxylated with heat to give indole 5.

== Variations ==
=== Butin modification ===
In an intramolecular version of the Reissert reaction, a furan ring-opening provides the carbonyl necessary for cyclization to form an indole. A ketone side chain is present in the final product, allowing further modifications.

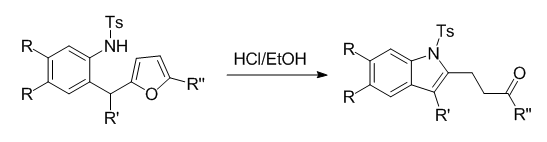

== See also ==
- Leimgruber-Batcho indole synthesis
