= Oskar Piloty =

German chemist (1866–1915)

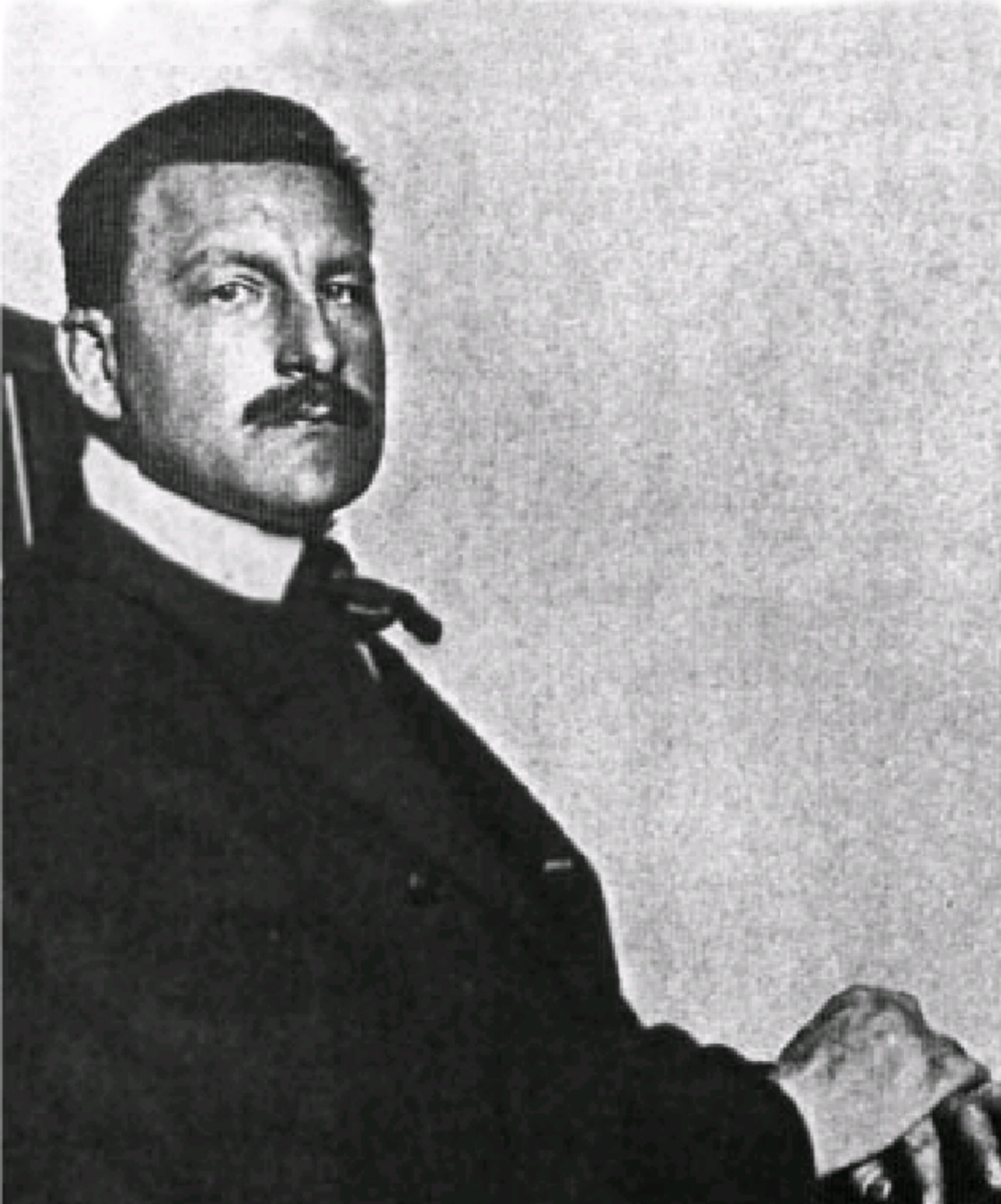
- Oskar Piloty
- Born: 30 April 1866; Munich, Kingdom of Bavaria
- Died: 6 October 1915 (aged 49); Sommepy, France
- Education: University of Würzburg
- Scientific career
- Workplaces: Friedrich Wilhelm University of Berlin, Ludwig-Maximilians-Universität München
- Doctoral advisor: Hermann Emil Fischer
- Doctoral students: Wilhelm Schlenk

Oskar Piloty (30 April 1866 – 6 October 1915) was a German chemist.

== Life ==
Oskar Piloty was born the son of the painter Karl von Piloty in Munich. Due to the closeness of the Piloty family to the chemist Ludwig Knorr, who later married the sister of Oskar Piloty, he started studying chemistry at Adolf von Baeyer's laboratory at the Ludwig-Maximilians-Universität München in 1888. After failing an exam by Bayer in 1889 he transferred to the University of Würzburg. He and his colleagues speculated that he failed because he fell in love with the daughter of Baeyer; Piloty married her in 1892.

At the University of Würzburg he worked with Emil Fischer on the chemistry of sugars, receiving his PhD in 1890. In 1891, they published the preparation of a novel unnatural sugar, l-ribose, by the epimerisation of L-arabonic acid and reduction of the resulting lactone. It was not until work by Phoebus Levene and Walter Jacobs in 1909 that it was recognised that d-ribose is a natural product, the enantiomer of Fischer and Piloty's product, and an essential component of nucleic acids. In 1892, he followed Fischer to the Friedrich Wilhelm University of Berlin where he worked until his father-in-law offered him a position at the Ludwig-Maximilians-Universität München in 1900. He accepted the position despite having a better offer from Fischer. He worked on the structure of natural products such as hemoglobin. Piloty's acid is named after him.

Although he was too old to be drafted for World War I, he fought at the Western Front where he was killed during a fight at the Second Battle of Champagne in 1915 near Sommepy.
