= Ribokinase =

ribokinase
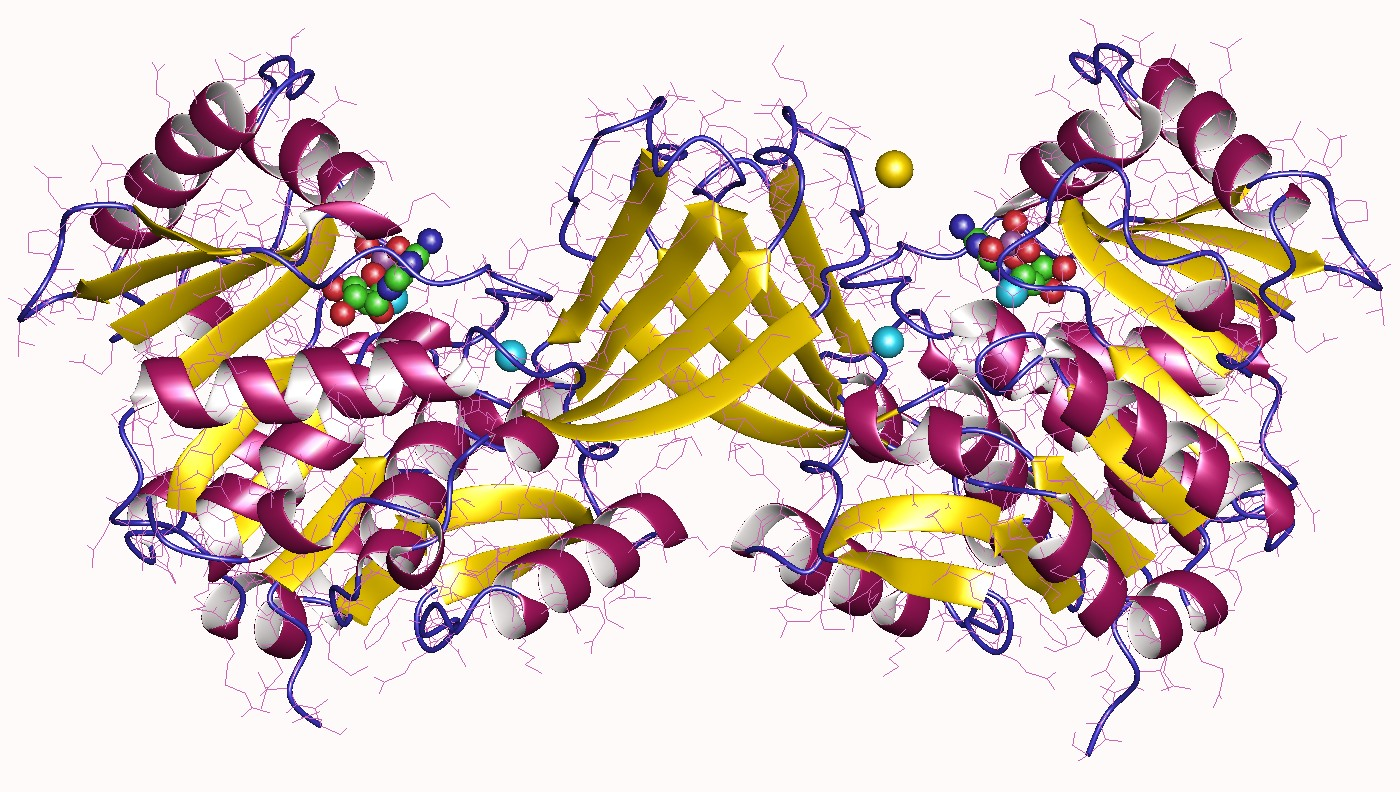
- Ribokinase dimer, Human

Identifiers
- EC no.: 2.7.1.15
- CAS no.: 9026-84-0

Databases
- IntEnz: IntEnz view
- BRENDA: BRENDA entry
- ExPASy: NiceZyme view
- KEGG: KEGG entry
- MetaCyc: metabolic pathway
- PRIAM: profile
- PDB structures: RCSB PDB PDBe PDBsum
- Gene Ontology: AmiGO / QuickGO
Search
- PMC: articles
- PubMed: articles
- NCBI: proteins

In enzymology, a ribokinase (EC 2.7.1.15) is an enzyme that catalyzes the chemical reaction

ATP +
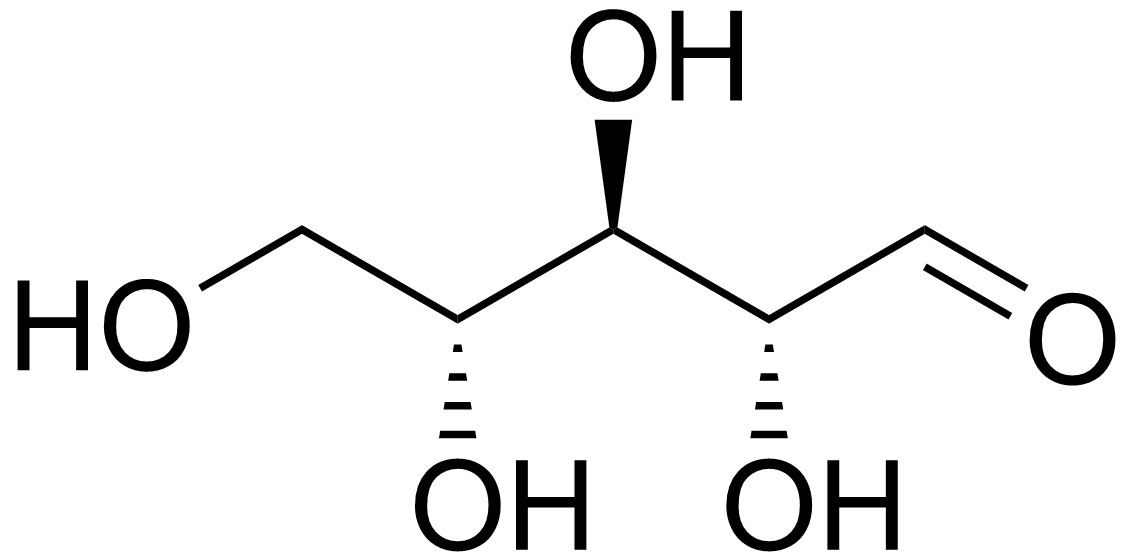
D-ribose
ADP +
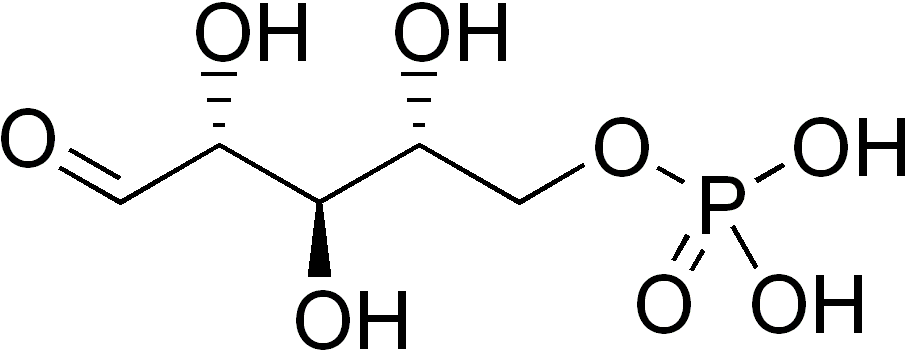
ribose 5-phosphate

The enzyme originally characterised from calf liver and Lactobacillus plantarum converts the pentose sugar, D-ribose (shown in its open-chain aldehydo form), to ribose 5-phosphate by transferring a phosphate group from the cofactor, adenosine triphosphate (ATP), which is converted to adenosine diphosphate (ADP).

The systematic name of this enzyme class is ATP:d-ribose 5-phosphotransferase. Other names in common use include deoxyribokinase, ribokinase (phosphorylating), and d-ribokinase.

Ribokinase (RK) belongs to the phosphofructokinase B (PfkB) family of sugar kinases. Other members of this family (also known as the RK family) include adenosine kinase (AK), inosine-guanosine kinase, fructokinase, and 1-phosphofructokinase. The members of the PfkB/RK family are identified by the presence of three conserved sequence motifs and the enzymatic activity of this family of protein generally shows a dependence on the presence of pentavalent ions. The conserved NXXE motif, which is a distinctive property of the PfkB family of proteins, is involved in pentavalent ion dependency. The structures of RK and several other PfK family of proteins have been determined from a number of organisms. Despite low sequence similarity between AdK and other PfkB family of proteins, these proteins are quite similar at structural levels.

== Structural studies ==
As of late 2007, 7 structures have been solved for this class of enzymes, with PDB accession codes 1GQT, 1RK2, 1RKA, 1RKD, 1RKS, 1VM7, and 2FV7.
