= Ribose =

Group of simple sugar and carbohydrate compounds

d-Ribose
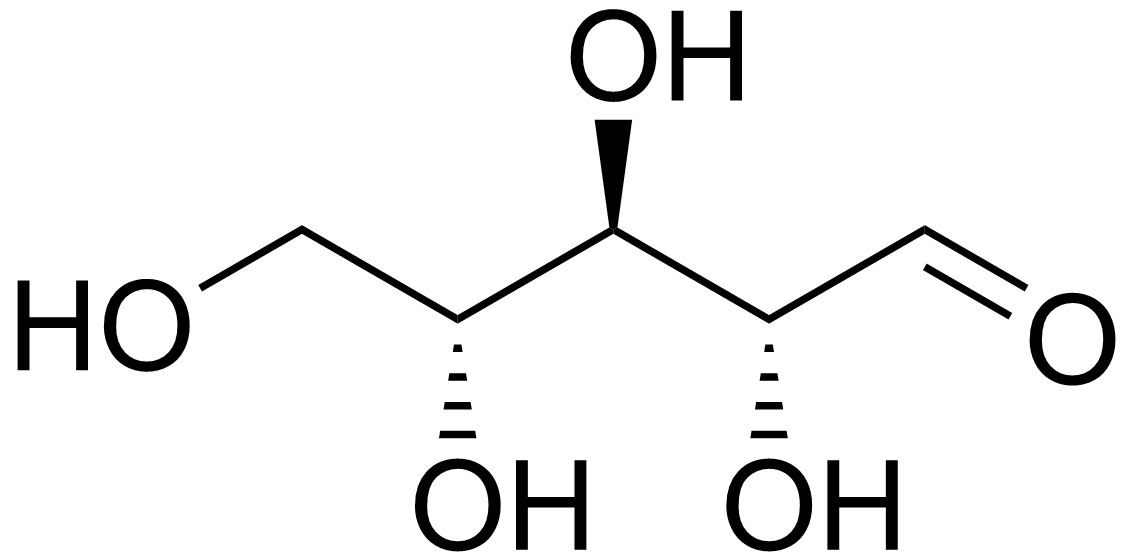

Names
- IUPAC names D-Ribose d-ribo-Pentose
- Systematic IUPAC name (2R,3R,4S,5R)-5-(hydroxymethyl)oxolane-2,3,4-triol (cyclic form)
- Other names d-Ribose

Identifiers
CAS Number	50-69-1
3D model (JSmol)	aldehydo form D-(−)-Ribose: Interactive image
ChEMBL	ChEMBL1159662
ChemSpider	4470639 aldehydo form D-(−)-Ribose
DrugBank	DB01936
EC Number	200-059-4
PubChem CID	5779; 5311110 aldehydo form D-(−)-Ribose
UNII	681HV46001
- InChI: aldehydo form D-(−)-Ribose: InChI=1/C5H10O5/c6-1-3(8)5(10)4(9)2-7/h1,3-5,7-10H,2H2/t3-,4+,5-/m0/s1 Key: PYMYPHUHKUWMLA-LMVFSUKVBD; Aldehydo form D-(−)-Ribose: InChI=1S/C5H10O5/c6-1-3(8)5(10)4(9)2-7/h1,3-5,7-10H,2H2/t3-,4+,5-/m0/s1 Key: PYMYPHUHKUWMLA-LMVFSUKVSA-N
- SMILES: aldehydo form D-(−)-Ribose: C([C@H]([C@H]([C@H](C=O)O)O)O)O

Properties
Chemical formula	C_{5}H_{10}O_{5}
Molar mass	150.13
Appearance	White solid
Melting point	95 °C (203 °F; 368 K)
Solubility in water	100 g/L (25 °C, 77 °F)
Chiral rotation ([α]_{D})	−21.5° (H_{2}O)

Related compounds
Related aldopentoses	Arabinose; Xylose; Lyxose
Related compounds	Deoxyribose
- Except where otherwise noted, data are given for materials in their standard state (at 25 °C [77 °F], 100 kPa). verify (what is ?) Infobox references

Ribose is a simple sugar and carbohydrate with molecular formula C_{5}H_{10}O_{5} and the linear-form composition H−(C=O)−(CHOH)_{4}−H. The naturally occurring form, d-ribose, is a component of the ribonucleotides from which RNA is built, and is thus necessary for the coding, decoding, regulation and expression of genes. It has a structural analog, deoxyribose, which is a similarly essential component of DNA.

German chemists Emil Fischer and Oscar Piloty first prepared l-ribose, an unnatural sugar, in 1891. In 1909, American chemists Phoebus Levene and Walter Jacobs recognised that d-ribose was the enantiomer of l-ribose and a natural product, being an essential component of nucleic acids.

== Overview ==
Ribose is a simple sugar and carbohydrate with molecular formula C_{5}H_{10}O_{5} and the linear-form composition H−(C=O)−(CHOH)_{4}−H. The naturally occurring form, d-ribose, is a component of the ribonucleotides from which RNA is built, and is thus necessary for the coding, decoding, regulation and expression of genes. It has a structural analog, deoxyribose, which is a similarly essential component of DNA.

β-d-ribofuranose

α-d-ribopyranose

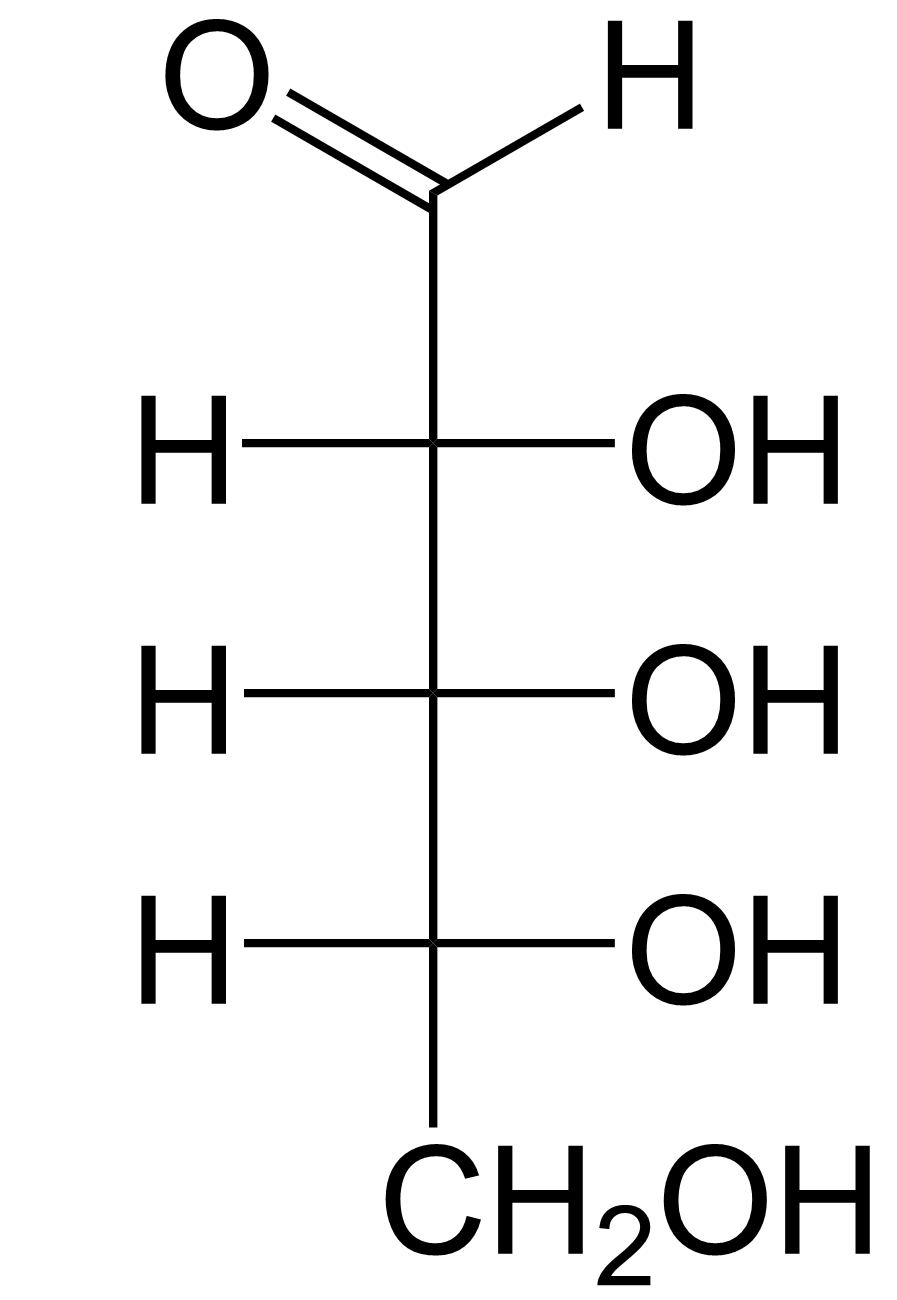
d-ribose

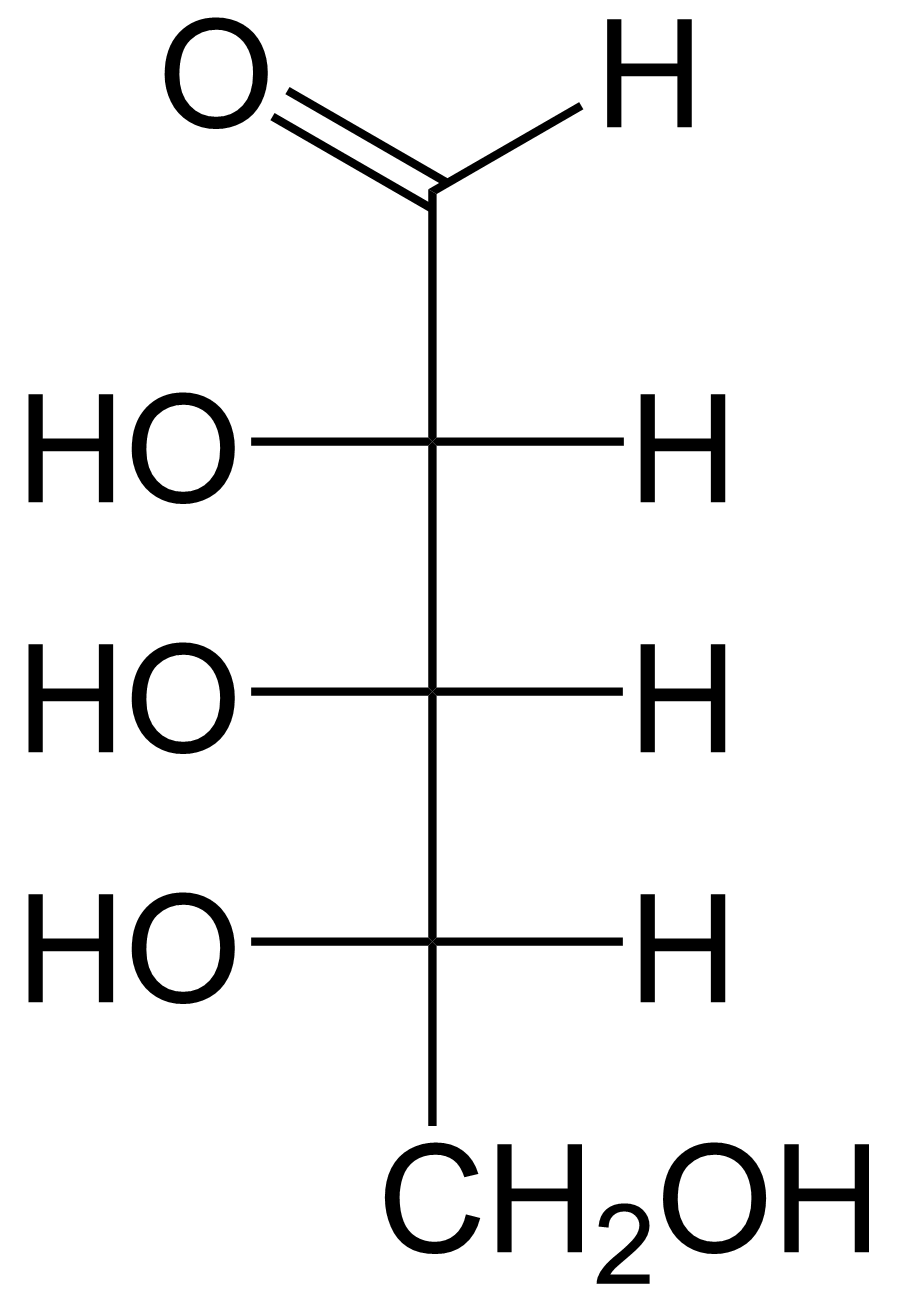
l-ribose

Left: Haworth projections of one of each of the furanose and pyranose forms of d-ribose
Right: Fischer projection of the open chain forms of d- and l- ribose

== History ==
l-ribose is an unnatural sugar that was first prepared by German chemists Emil Fischer and Oscar Piloty in 1891. Fischer chose the name "ribose" as it is a partial rearrangement of the name of another sugar, arabinose, of which ribose is an epimer at the 2' carbon; both names also relate to gum arabic, from which arabinose was first isolated and from which l-ribose was prepared.

It was only in 1909 that American chemists Phoebus Levene and Walter Jacobs recognised that d-ribose was the enantiomer of l-ribose and a natural product, being an essential component of nucleic acids.

== Synthesis and sources ==
l-ribose was first prepared from gum arabic.

Ribose as its 5-phosphate ester is typically produced from glucose by the pentose phosphate pathway. In at least some archaea, alternative pathways have been identified.

Ribose can be synthesized chemically, but commercial production relies on fermentation of glucose. Using genetically modified strains of Bacillus subtilis, 90 grams per litre (0.003 pounds per cubic inch) of ribose can be produced from 200 g (7 ounces) of glucose. The conversion entails the intermediacy of gluconate and ribulose.

Ribose has been detected in meteorites.

== Structure ==
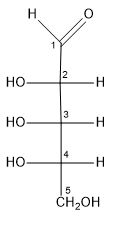
L-Ribose Fischer Projection

Ribose is an aldopentose (a monosaccharide containing five carbon atoms that, in its open chain form, has an aldehyde functional group at one end). In the conventional numbering scheme for monosaccharides, the carbon atoms are numbered from C1' (in the aldehyde group) to C5'. The deoxyribose derivative found in DNA differs from ribose by having a hydrogen atom in place of the hydroxyl group at C2'. This hydroxyl group performs a function in RNA splicing.

The "d-" in the name d-ribose refers to the stereochemistry of the chiral carbon atom farthest away from the aldehyde group (C4'). In d-ribose, as in all d-sugars, this carbon atom has the same configuration as in d-glyceraldehyde.

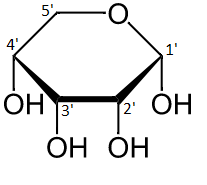
α-d-Ribopyranose

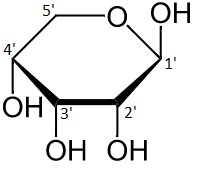
β-d-Ribopyranose

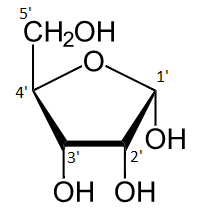
α-d-Ribofuranose

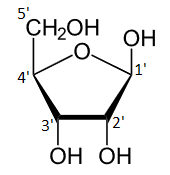
β-d-Ribofuranose

Relative abundance of forms of ribose in solution: β-d-ribopyranose (59%), α-d-ribopyranose (20%), β-d-ribofuranose (13%), α-d-ribofuranose (7%) and open chain (0.1%).

For ribose residues in nucleosides and nucleotides, the torsion angles for the rotation encompassing the bonds influence the configuration of the respective nucleoside and nucleotide. The secondary structure of a nucleic acid is determined by the rotation of its 7 torsion angles. Having a large amount of torsion angles allows for greater flexibility.

In closed ring riboses, the observed flexibility mentioned above is not observed because the ring cycle imposes a limit on the number of torsion angles possible in the structure. Conformers of closed form riboses differ in regards to how the lone oxygen in the molecule is positioned respective to the nitrogenous base (also known as a nucleobase or just a base) attached to the ribose. If a carbon is facing towards the base, then the ribose is labeled as endo. If a carbon is facing away from the base, then the ribose is labeled as exo. If there is an oxygen molecule attached to the 2' carbon of a closed cycle ribose, then the exo confirmation is more stable because it decreases the interactions of the oxygen with the base. The difference itself is quite small, but when looking at an entire chain of RNA the slight difference amounts to a sizable impact.

Like most sugars, ribose exists as a mixture of cyclic forms in equilibrium with its linear form, and these readily interconvert especially in aqueous solution. The name "ribose" is used in biochemistry and biology to refer to all of these forms, though more specific names for each are used when required. In its linear form, ribose can be recognised as the pentose sugar with all of its hydroxyl functional groups on the same side in its Fischer projection. d-Ribose has these hydroxyl groups on the right hand side and is associated with the systematic name (2R,3R,4R)-2,3,4,5-tetrahydroxypentanal, whilst l-ribose has its hydroxyl groups appear on the left hand side in a Fischer projection.

Cyclisation of ribose occurs via hemiacetal formation due to attack on the aldehyde by the C4' hydroxyl group to produce a furanose form or by the C5' hydroxyl group to produce a pyranose form. In each case, there are two possible geometric outcomes, named as α- and β- and known as anomers, depending on the stereochemistry at the hemiacetal carbon atom (the "anomeric carbon"). At room temperature, about 76% of d-ribose is present in pyranose forms (α:β = 1:2)> and 24% in the furanose forms (α:β = 1:3), with only about 0.1% of the linear form present.

Some pucker configurations of ribose

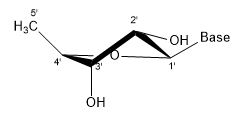
2' endo

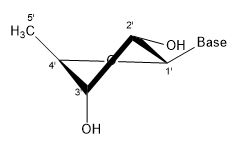
2' endo 3' exo

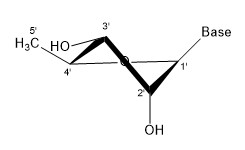
3' endo 2' exo

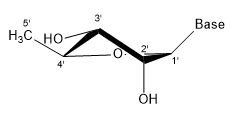
3' endo

A ribose molecule is typically represented as a planar molecule on paper. Despite this, it is typically non-planar in nature. Even between hydrogen atoms, the many constituents on a ribose molecule cause steric hindrance and strain between them. To relieve this crowding and ring strain, the ring puckers, i.e. becomes non-planar. This puckering is achieved by displacing an atom from the plane, relieving the strain and yielding a more stable conformation. Puckering, otherwise known as the sugar ring conformation (specifically ribose sugar), can be described by the amplitude of pucker as well as the pseudorotation angle. The pseudo-rotation angle can be described as either "north (N)" or "south (S)" range. While both ranges are found in double helices, the north range is commonly associated with RNA and the A form of DNA. In contrast, the south range is associated with B form DNA. Z-DNA contains sugars in both the north and south ranges.

When only a single atom is displaced, it is referred to as an "envelope" pucker. When two atoms are displaced, it is referred to as a "twist" pucker, in reference to the zigzag orientation. In an "endo" pucker, the major displacement of atoms is on the β-face, the same side as the C4'-C5' bond and the base. In an "exo" pucker, the major displacement of atoms is on the α-face, on the opposite side of the ring. The major forms of ribose are the 3'-endo pucker (commonly adopted by RNA and A-form DNA) and 2'-endo pucker (commonly adopted by B-form DNA). These ring puckers are developed from changes in ring torsion angles; there are infinite combinations of angles so therefore, there is an infinite number of transposable pucker conformations, each separated by disparate activation energies.

== Functions ==
ATP is derived from ribose; it contains one ribose, three phosphate groups, and an adenine base. ATP is created during cellular respiration from adenosine diphosphate (ATP with one less phosphate group).

=== Signaling pathways ===
Ribose is a building block in secondary signaling molecules such as cyclic adenosine monophosphate (cAMP) which is derived from ATP. One specific case in which cAMP is used is in cAMP-dependent signaling pathways. In cAMP signaling pathways, either a stimulative or inhibitory hormone receptor is activated by a signal molecule. These receptors are linked to a stimulative or inhibitory regulative G-protein. When a stimulative G-protein is activated, adenylyl cyclase catalyzes ATP into cAMP by using Mg^{2+} or Mn^{2+}. cAMP, a secondary messenger, then goes on to activate protein kinase A, which is an enzyme that regulates cell metabolism. Protein kinase A regulates metabolic enzymes by phosphorylation which causes a change in the cell depending on the original signal molecule. The opposite occurs when an inhibitory G-protein is activated; the G-protein inhibits adenylyl cyclase and ATP is not converted to cAMP.

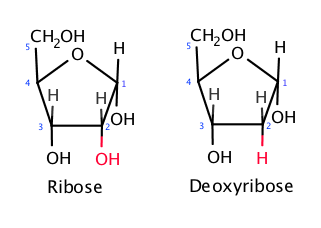
The difference between ribose and deoxyribose is the presence of a 2'OH

=== Metabolism ===
Ribose is referred to as the "molecular currency" because of its involvement in intracellular energy transfers. For example, nicotinamide adenine dinucleotide (NAD), flavin adenine dinucleotide (FAD), and nicotinamide adenine dinucleotide phosphate (NADP) all contain the d-ribofuranose moiety. They can each be derived from d-ribose after it is converted to d-ribose 5-phosphate by the enzyme ribokinase. NAD, FAD, and NADP act as electron acceptors in biochemical redox reactions in major metabolic pathways including glycolysis, the citric acid cycle, fermentation, and the electron transport chain.

The pentose phosphate pathway begins with d-glucose and includes d-ribose 5-phosphate as an intermediate.

=== Nucleotide biosynthesis ===
Nucleotides are synthesized through salvage or de novo synthesis. Nucleotide salvage uses pieces of previously made nucleotides and re-synthesizes them for future use. In de novo, amino acids, carbon dioxide, folate derivatives, and phosphoribosyl pyrophosphate (PRPP) are used to synthesize nucleotides. Both de novo and salvage require PRPP which is synthesized from ATP and ribose 5-phosphate by an enzyme called PRPP synthetase.

== Modifications ==
The ribonucleosides adenosine, cytidine, guanosine, and uridine are all derivatives of β-d-ribofuranose. Metabolically important species that include phosphorylated ribose include ADP, ATP, coenzyme A, and NADH. cAMP and cGMP serve as secondary messengers in some signaling pathways and are also ribose derivatives. The ribose moiety appears in some pharmaceutical agents, including the antibiotics neomycin and paromomycin.

=== Modifications in nature ===
Ribokinase catalyzes the conversion of d-ribose to d-ribose 5-phosphate. Once converted, d-ribose-5-phosphate is available for the manufacturing of the amino acids tryptophan and histidine, or for use in the pentose phosphate pathway. The absorption of d-ribose is 88–100% in the small intestines (up to 200 mg/kg·h).

One important modification occurs at the C2' position of the ribose molecule. By adding an O-alkyl group, the nuclear resistance of the RNA is increased because of additional stabilizing forces. These forces are stabilizing because of the increase of intramolecular hydrogen bonding and an increase in the glycosidic bond stability. The resulting increase of resistance leads to increases in the half-life of siRNA and the potential therapeutic potential in cells and animals. The methylation of ribose at particular sites is correlated with a decrease in immune stimulation.

=== Synthetic modifications ===
Along with phosphorylation, ribofuranose molecules can exchange their oxygen with selenium and sulfur to produce similar sugars that only vary at the 4' position. These derivatives are more lipophilic than the original molecule. Increased lipophilicity makes these species more suitable for use in techniques such as PCR, RNA aptamer post-modification, antisense technology, and for phasing X-ray crystallographic data.

Similar to the 2' modifications in nature, a synthetic modification of ribose includes the addition of fluorine at the 2' position. This fluorinated ribose acts similar to the methylated ribose because it is capable of suppressing immune stimulation depending on the location of the ribose in the DNA strand. The big difference between methylation and fluorination, is the latter only occurs through synthetic modifications. The addition of fluorine leads to an increase in the stabilization of the glycosidic bond and an increase of intramolecular hydrogen bonds.

== Medical uses ==
d-ribose has been suggested for use in management of congestive heart failure (as well as other forms of heart disease) and for chronic fatigue syndrome (CFS), also called myalgic encephalomyelitis (ME) in an open-label non-blinded, non-randomized, and non-crossover subjective study.

Supplemental d-ribose can bypass part of the pentose phosphate pathway, an energy-producing pathway, to produce d-ribose-5-phosphate. The enzyme glucose-6-phosphate-dehydrogenase (G-6-PDH) is often in short supply in cells, but more so in diseased tissue, such as in myocardial cells in patients with cardiac disease. The supply of d-ribose in the mitochondria is directly correlated with ATP production; decreased d-ribose supply reduces the amount of ATP being produced. Studies suggest that supplementing d-ribose following tissue ischemia (e.g. myocardial ischemia) increases myocardial ATP production, and therefore mitochondrial function.

Essentially, administering supplemental d-ribose bypasses an enzymatic step in the pentose phosphate pathway by providing an alternate source of 5-phospho-d-ribose 1-pyrophosphate for ATP production. Supplemental d-ribose enhances recovery of ATP levels while also reducing cellular injury in humans and other animals. One study suggested that the use of supplemental d-ribose reduces the instance of angina in men with diagnosed coronary artery disease. d-Ribose has been used to treat many pathological conditions, such as chronic fatigue syndrome, fibromyalgia, and myocardial dysfunction. It is also used to reduce symptoms of cramping, pain, stiffness, etc. after exercise and to improve athletic performance.
