= Walter Abraham Jacobs =

American chemist (1883 – 1967)

Walter A. Jacobs
- Born: December 24, 1883; New York, U.S.
- Died: July 12, 1967 (aged 83); Los Angeles, California, U.S.
- Education: University of Berlin 1907
- Known for: Gould-Jacobs reaction
- Scientific career
- Doctoral advisor: Hermann Emil Fischer

Walter Abraham Jacobs (December 24, 1883 – July 12, 1967) was an American chemist who discovered the Gould-Jacobs reaction. Much of his career was spent at the Rockefeller Institute for Medical Research, New York City.
