= Coupling reaction =

Type of reaction in organic chemistry

In organic chemistry, a coupling reaction is a type of reaction in which two reactant molecules are bonded together. Such reactions often require the aid of a metal catalyst. In one important reaction type, a main group organometallic compound of the type R-M (where R = organic group, M = main group centre metal atom) reacts with an organic halide of the type R'-X with formation of a new carbon–carbon bond in the product R-R'. The most common type of coupling reaction is the cross coupling reaction.

Richard F. Heck, Ei-ichi Negishi, and Akira Suzuki were awarded the 2010 Nobel Prize in Chemistry for developing palladium-catalyzed cross coupling reactions.

Broadly speaking, two types of coupling reactions are recognized:

- Homocouplings joining two identical partners. The product is symmetrical R−R
- Heterocouplings joining two different partners. These reactions are also called cross-coupling reactions. The product is unsymmetrical, R−R'.

== Homo-coupling types ==
Coupling reactions are illustrated by the Ullmann reaction:

Ullmann overview

Reaction	Year	Organic compound		Coupler	Remark
Wurtz reaction	1855	R-X	sp^{3}	Na as reductant	dry ether as medium
Pinacol coupling reaction	1859	R-HC=O or R_{2}(C=O)		various metals	requires proton donor
Glaser coupling	1869	RC≡CH	sp	Cu	O_{2} as H-acceptor
Ullmann reaction	1901	Ar-X	sp^{2}	Cu	high temperatures
Fittig reaction		Ar-X	sp^{2}	Na	dry ether as medium
Scholl reaction	1910	ArH	sp^{2}	NaAlCl_{4}(l)	O_{2} as H-acceptor; presumably trace Fe^{3+} catalyst; requires high heat

== Cross-coupling types ==
The Heck reaction

Reaction	Year	Reactant A		Reactant B		Catalyst	Remark
Grignard reaction	1900	R-MgBr	sp, sp^{2}, sp^{3}	R-HC=O or R(C=O)R_{2}	sp^{2}	not catalytic	
Gomberg–Bachmann reaction	1924	Ar-H	sp^{2}	Ar'-N_{2}^{+}X^{−}	sp^{2}	not catalytic	
Cadiot–Chodkiewicz coupling	1957	RC≡CH	sp	RC≡CX	sp	Cu	requires base
Castro–Stephens coupling	1963	RC≡CH	sp	Ar-X	sp^{2}	Cu	requires base
Corey–House synthesis	1967	R_{2}CuLi or RMgX	sp^{3}	R-X	sp^{2}, sp^{3}	Cu	Cu-catalyzed version by Kochi, 1971
Cassar reaction	1970	Alkene	sp^{2}	R-X	sp^{3}	Pd	requires base
Kumada coupling	1972	Ar-MgBr	sp^{2}, sp^{3}	Ar-X	sp^{2}	Pd or Ni or Fe	
Heck reaction	1972	alkene	sp^{2}	Ar-X	sp^{2}	Pd or Ni	requires base
Sonogashira coupling	1975	RC≡CH	sp	R-X	sp^{3} sp^{2}	Pd and Cu	requires base
Murahashi coupling	1975	RLi	sp^{2}, sp^{3}	Ar-X	sp^{2}	Pd or Ni	Pd-catalyzed version by Murahashi, 1979
Negishi coupling	1977	R-Zn-X	sp^{3}, sp^{2}, sp	R-X	sp^{3} sp^{2}	Pd or Ni	
Stille reaction	1978	R-SnR_{3}	sp^{3}, sp^{2}, sp	R-X	sp^{3} sp^{2}	Pd	
Suzuki reaction	1979	R-B(OR)_{2}	sp^{2}	R-X	sp^{3} sp^{2}	Pd or Ni	requires base
Hiyama coupling	1988	R-SiR_{3}	sp^{2}	R-X	sp^{3} sp^{2}	Pd	requires base
Buchwald–Hartwig amination	1994	R_{2}N-H	sp^{3}	R-X	sp^{2}	Pd	N-C coupling, second generation free amine
Fukuyama coupling	1998	R-Zn-I	sp^{3}	RCO(SEt)	sp^{2}	Pd or Ni	
Liebeskind–Srogl coupling	2000	R-B(OR)_{2}	sp^{3}, sp^{2}	RCO(SEt) Ar-SMe	sp^{2}	Pd	requires CuTC
(Li) Cross dehydrogenative coupling (CDC)	2004	R-H	sp, sp^{2}, sp^{3}	R'-H	sp, sp^{2}, sp^{3}	Cu, Fe, Pd etc	requires oxidant or dehydrogenation
Wurtz–Fittig reaction	1864	R-X	sp^{3}	Ar-X	sp^{2}	Na	dry ether

== Applications ==
Coupling reactions are routinely employed in the preparation of pharmaceuticals. Conjugated polymers are prepared using this technology as well.
