= Murahashi coupling =

Murahashi Coupling
Named after	Shun-Ichi Murahashi
Reaction type	Coupling reaction

The Murahashi Coupling is a cross coupling reaction. The coupling partners are organolithiums and organic halides. Transition metal catalysts are required. The reaction was first reported by Shun-Ichi Murahashi in 1974. This reaction is notable for using organolithiums as opposed to other cross-coupling reactions which utilize various metal-carbon compounds (metal = tin, magnesium, boron, silicon, zinc). Since the production of these other coupling reagents relies heavily upon organolithiums (especially in the case of organozinc and organomagnesium compounds), in bypassing these intermediates, this process is much more efficient. It has further been shown that the Murahashi reaction proceeds with greater selectivity, faster reaction times, and lower reaction temperatures than other similar coupling reactions while maintaining similar or higher yields.

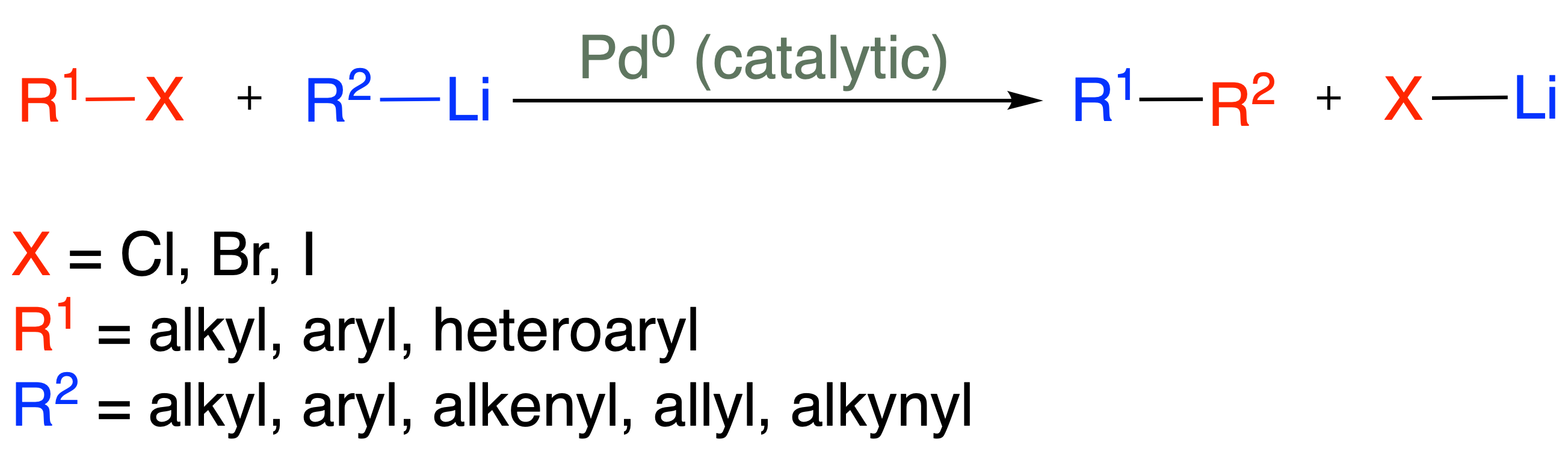
General reaction scheme for the Murahashi Coupling reaction.

== History ==
Murahashi first reported C(sp^{2})—C(sp^{3}) coupling in 1974. These reactions were not metal catalyzed but were promoted by solvent, THF. The following year, Murahashi showed that coupling can occur between organolithium and alkenyl halides in the presence of tetrakis(triphenylphosphine)palladium catalyst. In 1979, Murahashi published the catalytic version of this reaction.

== Mechanism ==
=== Palladium catalysis ===
The catalytic cycle of the Murahashi coupling is comparable to that of other extensively studied palladium-catalyzed cross-coupling reactions. The cycle proposed by Murahashi involves four intermediates and two oxidation states of palladium, palladium(0) and palladium(II). At the start of the cycle, oxidative addition occurs between the Pd(0) catalyst (1) and an organo-halide to form an organo-Pd(II) complex (2). A transmetallation then occurs between (2) and an organo-lithium to yield the trans-hetero-organometallic complex (3) and the lithium-halide. In order to perform the reductive elimination that ultimately yields the final coupled product, a trans-cis-isomerization of (3) must occur to bring the ligands cis to each other, resulting in the cis-hetero-organometallic complex (4). Finally, reductive elimination of (4) regenerates the Pd(0) catalyst and creates the C(sp^{2})--C(sp^{3}) bond in the coupled product.

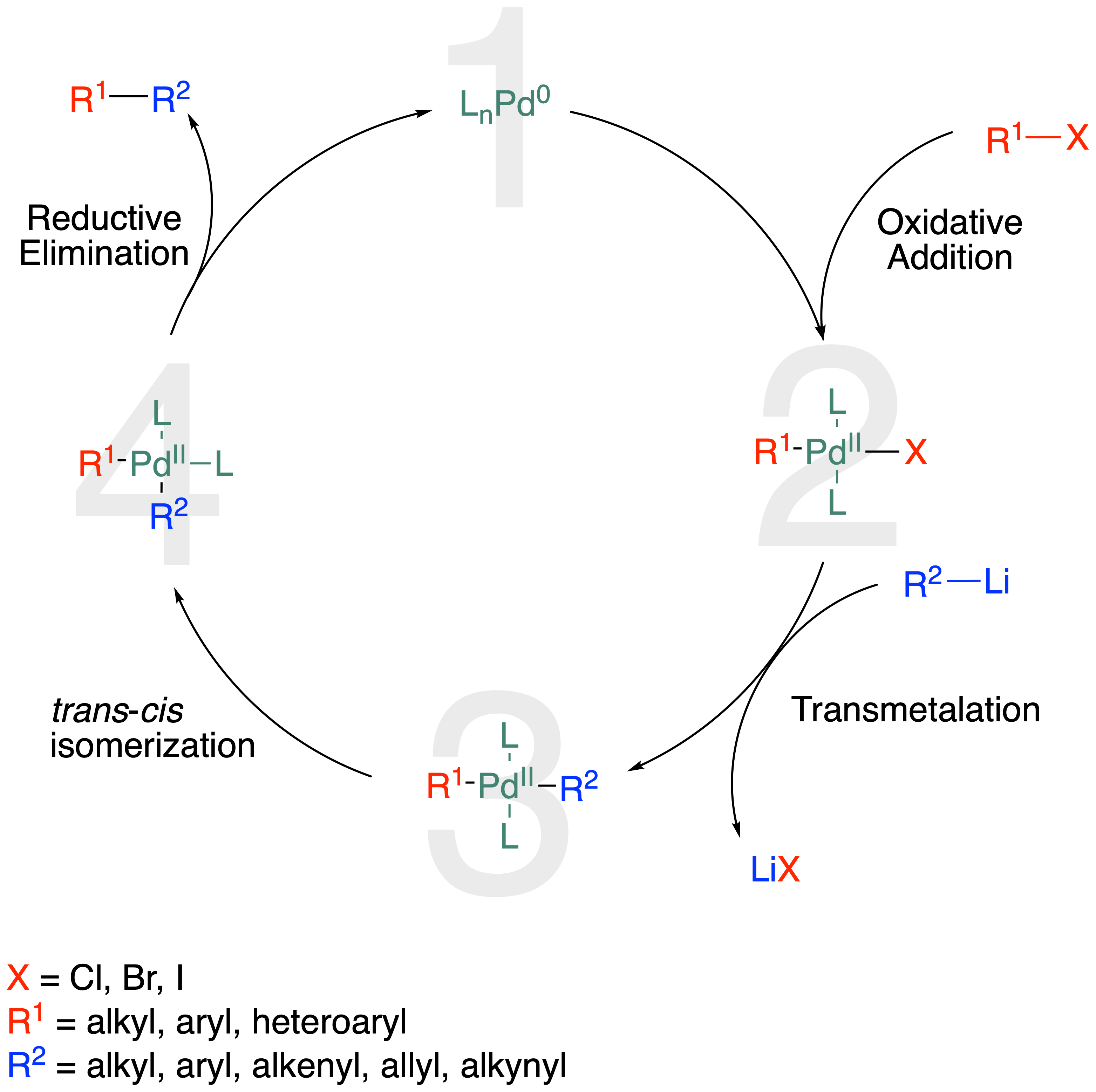
A scheme for the Murahashi Coupling catalytic cycle.

== Conditions limitations ==
Organolithium reagents pose some danger because they are highly pyrophoric. The reaction is typically carried out in toluene as a solvent . The mixture is often carried out between 0–80 °C and quenched with acid to deactivate any remaining organolithium.

== Ruthenium catalysis ==
While Pd(0)-catalyzed reactions are highly efficient for the cross-coupling of organo-halides and organolithium reagents, ruthenium catalysts have also been demonstrated.

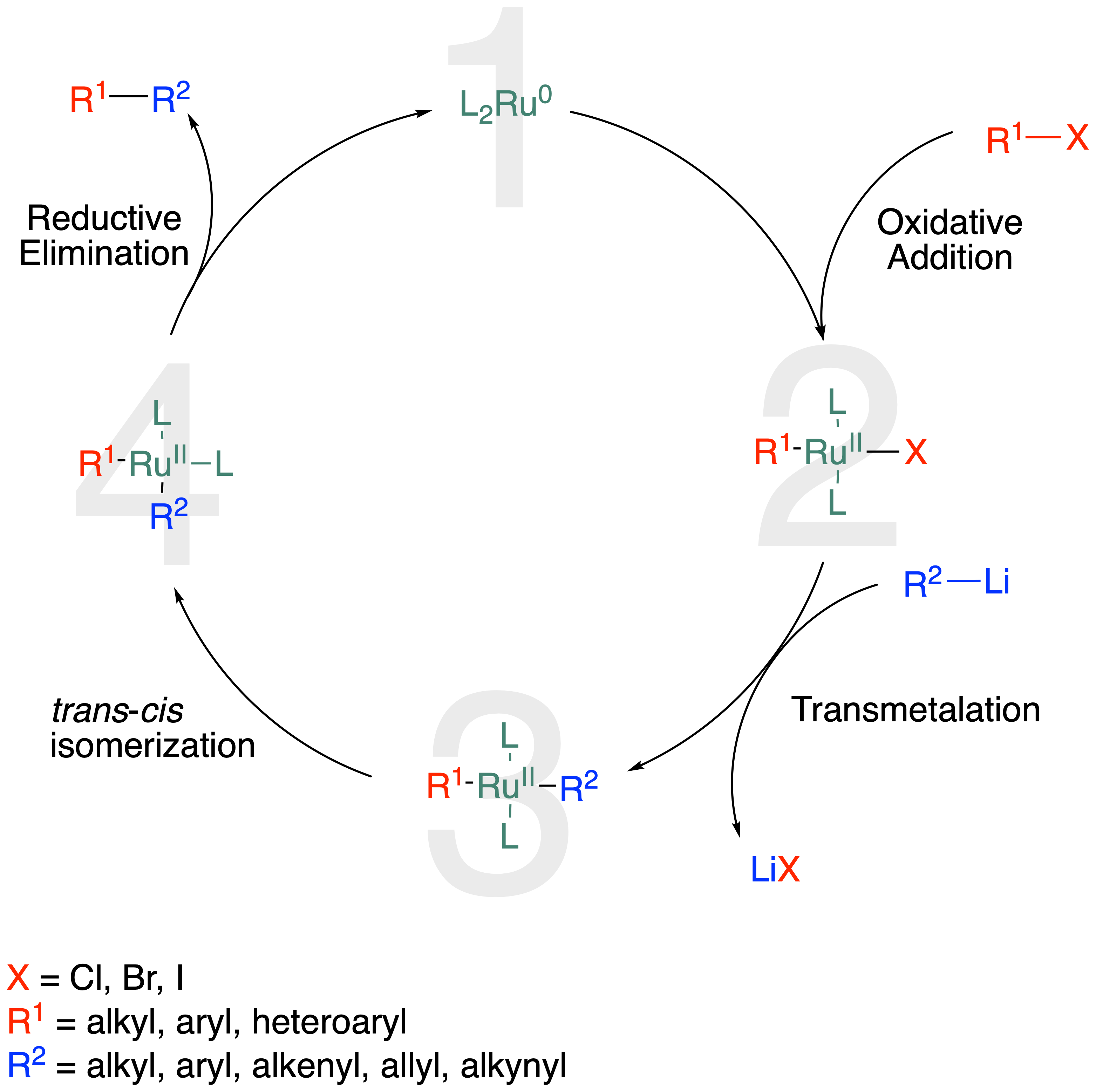
Catalytic cycle for the Murahashi coupling with a ruthenium catalyst.

== See also ==
- Heck reaction
- Hiyama coupling
- Suzuki reaction
- Negishi coupling
- Petasis reaction
- Stille reaction
- Sonogashira coupling
- Kumada coupling
