= Kumada =

Kumada (written: 熊田 lit. "bear rice field") is a Japanese surname. Notable people with the surname include:

- Makoto Kumada (熊田 誠, 1920–2007), Japanese chemist
- Sea Kumada (熊田 聖亜, born 2001), Japanese child actress
- Yoko Kumada (熊田 曜子, born 1982), Japanese gravure idol and singer
- Yoshinori Kumada (熊田 喜則, born 1961), Japanese footballer and manager

== See also ==
- Kumada coupling, a cross coupling reaction
