= Kenkichi Sonogashira =

Japanese chemist

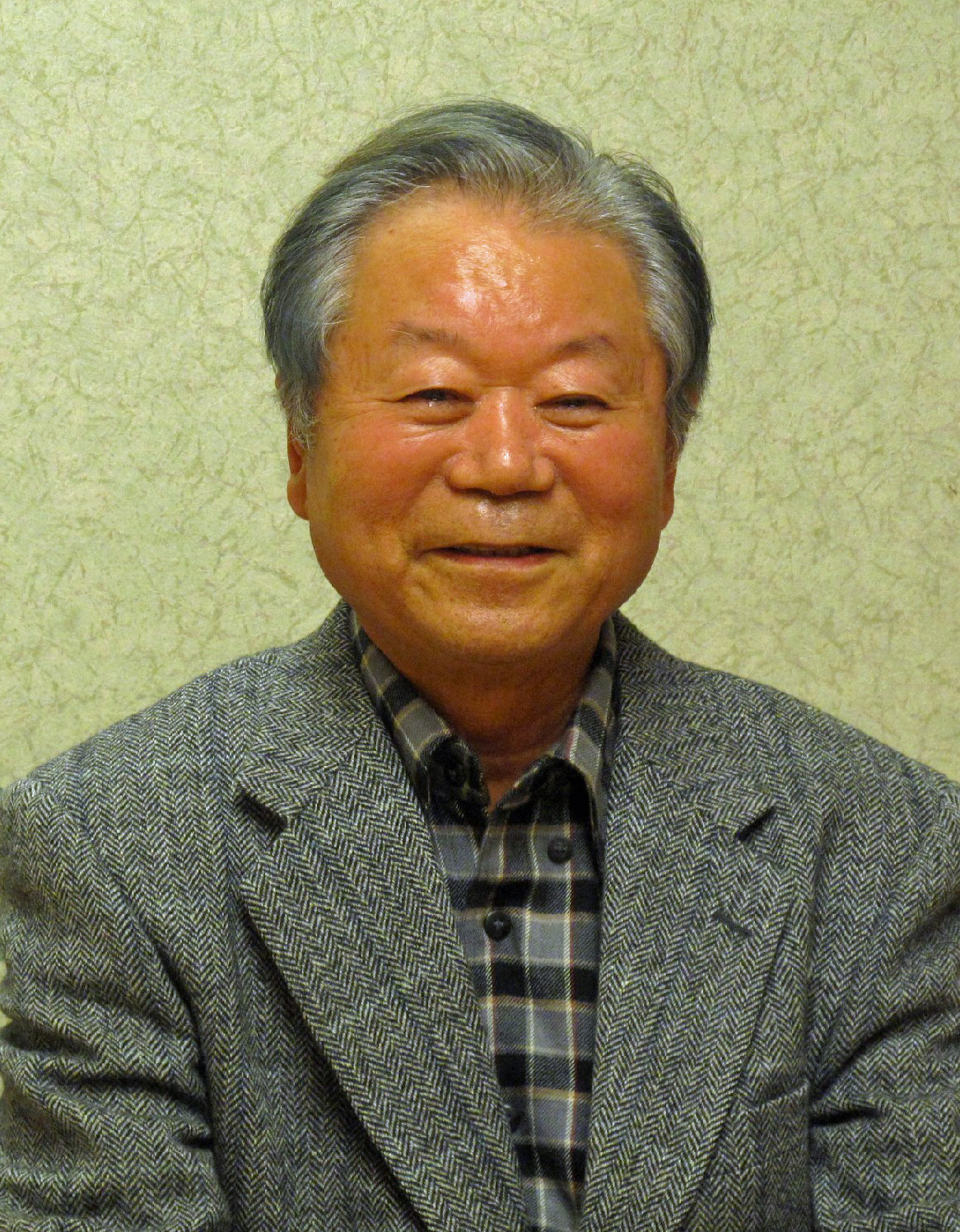
- Born: 25 October 1931 (age 94)
- Education: Osaka University
- Known for: Sonogashira coupling
- Scientific career
- Workplaces: Osaka University, Osaka City University

Kenkichi Sonogashira (薗頭 健吉, Sonogashira Kenkichi; born 25 October 1931) is a Japanese chemist and was a professor of chemistry at Osaka University in Japan. He discovered the Sonogashira coupling in 1975. Sonogashira was later a professor at Osaka City University and retired in 2004.

== See also ==
- Richard F. Heck
- Makoto Kumada
- Ei-ichi Negishi
- Akira Suzuki
