= Sonogashira coupling =

Cross-coupling reaction used in organic synthesis

| Named after | Kenkichi Sonogashira |
| Reaction type | Coupling reaction |

Identifiers
| Organic Chemistry Portal | sonogashira-coupling |
| RSC ontology ID | RXNO:0000137 |

Examples and Related Reactions
| Similar reactions | Copper-free Sonogashira coupling |

The Sonogashira reaction is a cross-coupling reaction used in organic synthesis to form carbon–carbon bonds. It employs a palladium catalyst as well as copper co-catalyst to form a carbon–carbon bond between a terminal alkyne and an aryl or vinyl halide.

$\begin{array}{c} {} \\ {\color{Red}\ce{R^1} }\ce{-X} + \ce{H}{-\color{Blue}\!{\equiv}\!\ce{-R^2} } \ \ce{->[\text{[Pd] cat., [Cu] cat.}][\text{base, rt}]} \ {\color{Red}\ce{R^1} }{\color{Blue}-\!{\equiv}\!\ce{-R^2} } \end{array}$

The Sonogashira reaction

- R^{1}: aryl or vinyl
- R^{2}: arbitrary
- X: I, Br, Cl or OTf

The Sonogashira cross-coupling reaction has been employed in a wide variety of areas, due to its usefulness in the formation of carbon–carbon bonds. The reaction can be carried out under mild conditions, such as at room temperature, in aqueous media, and with a mild base, which has allowed for the use of the Sonogashira cross-coupling reaction in the synthesis of complex molecules. Its applications include pharmaceuticals, natural products, organic materials, and nanomaterials. Specific examples include its use in the synthesis of tazarotene, which is a treatment for psoriasis and acne, and in the preparation of SIB-1508Y, also known as Altinicline, a nicotinic receptor agonist.

== History ==
The alkynylation reaction of aryl halides using aromatic acetylenes was reported in 1975 in three independent contributions by Cassar, Dieck and Heck as well as Sonogashira, Tohda and Hagihara. All of the reactions employ palladium catalysts to afford the same reaction products. However, the protocols of Cassar and Heck are performed solely by the use of palladium and require harsh reaction conditions (i.e. high reaction temperatures). The use of copper-cocatalyst in addition to palladium complexes in Sonogashira's procedure enabled the reactions to be carried under mild reaction conditions in excellent yields. A rapid development of the Pd/Cu systems followed and enabled a myriad of synthetic applications, while Cassar-Heck conditions were left, perhaps unjustly, less well-remembered. The reaction's broad utility can be evidenced by the amount of research still being conducted toward understanding and optimizing its synthetic scope as well as employing the procedures to prepare various compounds of synthetic, medicinal, material, and industrial importance. Among the cross-coupling reactions, it places third in the number of publications - after Suzuki and Heck reactions. A search for the term "Sonogashira" in SciFinder provides over 1500 references for journal publications between 2007 and 2010.

The Sonogashira reaction has become so well known that often many transformations that use a modern organometallic catalyst to couple alkyne motifs are termed a variant of a "Sonogashira reaction", despite the fact that these reactions are not carried out under true Sonogashira reaction conditions.

== Mechanism ==
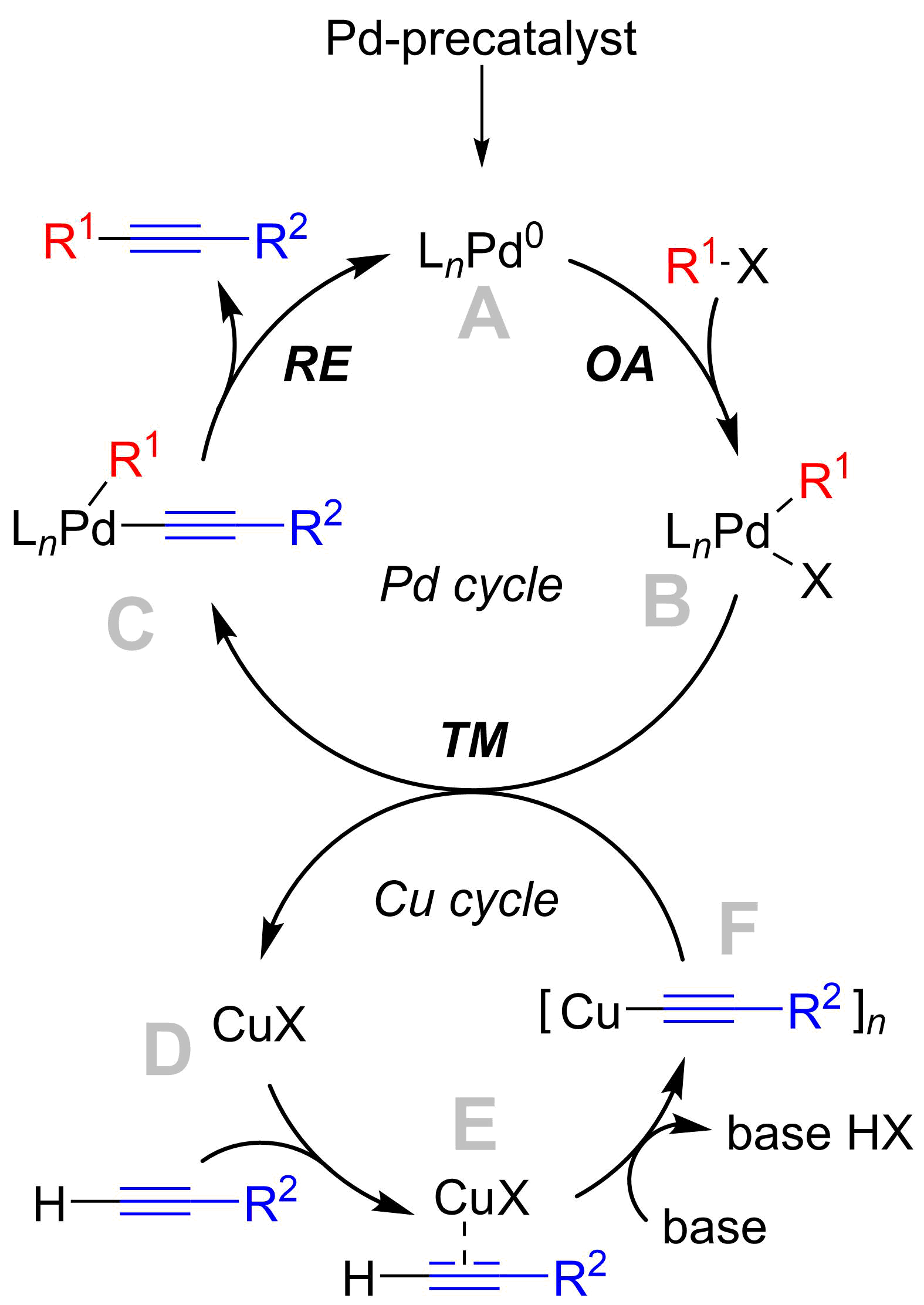
Catalytic cycle for the Sonogashira reaction

The reaction mechanism is not clearly understood, but the textbook mechanism revolves around a palladium cycle which is in agreement with the "classical" cross-coupling mechanism, and a copper cycle, which is less well known.

=== The palladium cycle ===
- Palladium precatalyst species are activated under reaction conditions to form a reactive Pd^{0} compound, A. The exact identity of the catalytic species depends strongly upon reaction conditions. With simple phosphines, such as PPh_{3} (n=2), and in case of bulky phosphines (i.e., P(o-Tol)_{3}) it was demonstrated that monoligated species (n=1) are formed. Furthermore, some results point to the formation of anionic palladium species, [L_{2}Pd^{0}Cl]^{−} , which could be the real catalysts in the presence of anions and halides.
- The active Pd^{0} catalyst is involved in the oxidative addition step with the aryl or vinyl halide substrate to produce Pd^{II} species B. Similar to the above discussion, its structure depends on the employed ligands. This step is believed to be the rate-limiting step of the reaction.
- Complex B reacts with copper acetylide, complex F, in a transmetallation step, yielding complex C and regenerating the copper catalyst.
- The structure of complex C depends on the properties of the ligands. For the facile reductive elimination to occur, the substrate motifs need to be in close vicinity, i.e. cis-orientation, so there can be trans-cis isomerisation involved. In reductive elimination the product tolane is expelled from the complex and the active Pd catalytic species is regenerated.

=== The copper cycle ===
- The copper cycle is not entirely well described. It is suggested that the presence of a base results in the formation of a π-alkyne complex E. This increases the acidity of the terminal proton and leads to the formation of copper acetylide, complex F, upon deprotonation.
- Acetylide F is then involved in the transmetallation reaction with palladium intermediate B.

=== The mechanism of a copper-free Sonogashira variant ===
Although beneficial for the effectiveness of the reaction, the use of copper salts in "classical" Sonogashira reaction is accompanied with several drawbacks, such as the application of environmentally unfriendly reagents, the formation of undesirable alkyne homocoupling (Glaser side products), and the necessity of strict oxygen exclusion in the reaction mixture. Thus, with the aim of excluding copper from the reaction, a lot of effort was undertaken in the developments of Cu-free Sonogashira reaction. Along the development of new reaction conditions, many experimental and computational studies focused on elucidation of reaction mechanism. Until recently, the exact mechanism by which the Cu-free reaction occurs was under debate, with critical mechanistic questions unanswered. It was shown in 2018 by Košmrlj et al. that the reaction proceeds along the two interconnected Pd^{0}/Pd^{II} catalytic cycles.

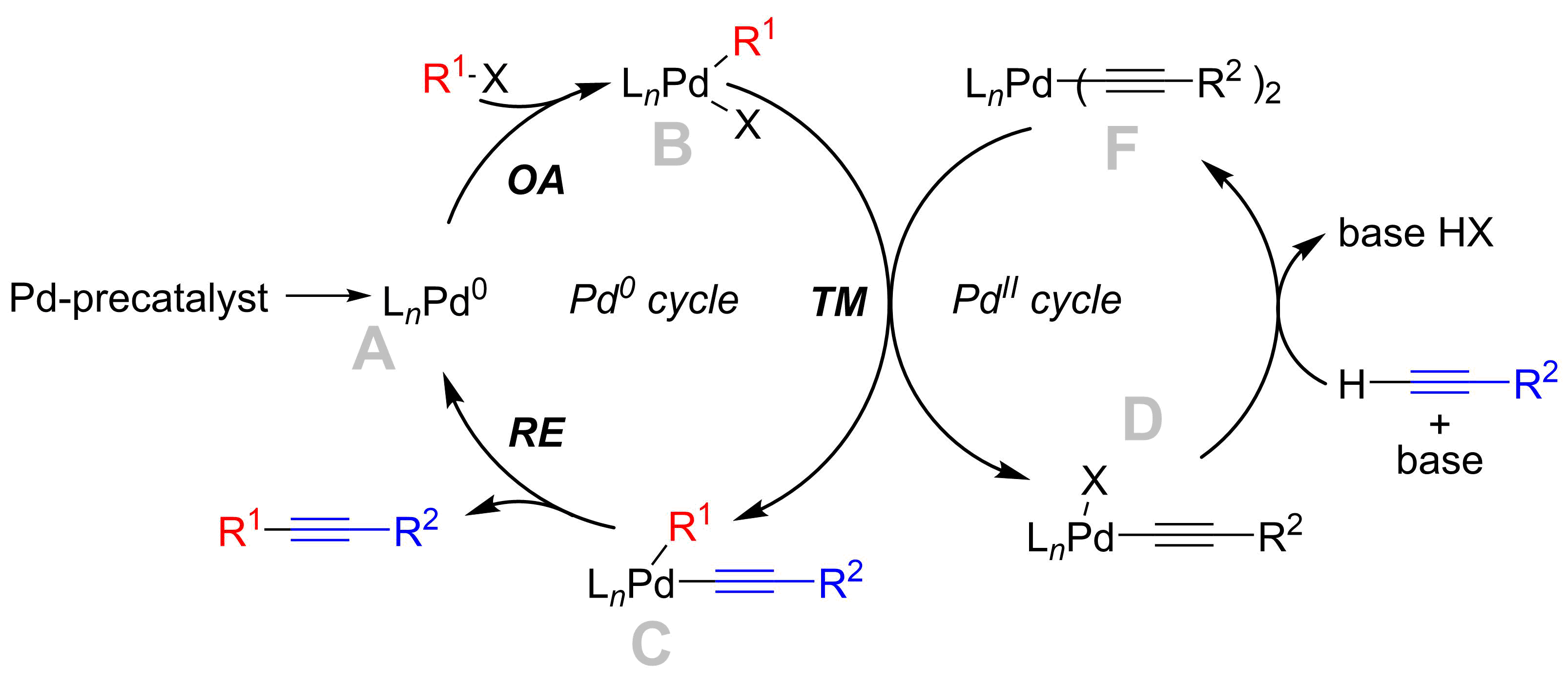
Mechanism for the Cu-free Sonogashira reaction.

Mechanism for the Cu-free Sonogashira reaction.

- Similar to the original mechanism, the Pd^{0} cycle begins with the oxidative addition of the aryl halide or triflate to the Pd^{0} catalyst, forming complex B and activating aryl halide substrate for the reaction.
- Acetylene is activated in the second, Pd^{II} mediated cycle. Phenylacetylene was proven to form Pd monoacetylide complex D as well as Pd bisacetylide complex F under mild reaction conditions.
- Both activated species, namely complexes B and F, are involved in the transmetallation step, forming complex C and regenerating D.
- The resulting products of reductive elimination, disubstituted alkyne product as well as regenerated Pd^{0} catalytic species, complete the Pd^{0} catalytic cycle.

It was demonstrated that amines are competitive to the phosphines and can also participate as ligands L in the described reaction species. Depending on the rate of the competition between amine and phosphines, a dynamic and complex interplay is expected when using different coordinative bases.

== Reaction conditions ==
The Sonogashira reaction is typically run under mild conditions. The cross-coupling is carried out at room temperature with a base, typically an amine, such as diethylamine, that also acts as the solvent. The reaction medium must be basic to neutralize the hydrogen halide produced as the byproduct of this coupling reaction, so alkylamine compounds such as triethylamine and diethylamine are sometimes used as solvents, but also DMF or ether can be used as solvent. Other bases such as potassium carbonate or cesium carbonate are occasionally used. In addition, deaerated conditions are formally needed for Sonogashira coupling reactions because the palladium(0) complexes are unstable in the air, and oxygen promotes the formation of homocoupled acetylenes. Recently, development of air-stable organopalladium catalysts enable this reaction to be conducted in the ambient atmosphere. In addition, R.M Al-Zoubi and co-workers successfully developed a method with high regioselectivity for 1,2,3-trihaloarene derivatives in good to high yields under ambient conditions.

=== Catalysts ===
Typically, two catalysts are needed for this reaction: a zerovalent palladium complex and a copper(I) halide salt. Common examples of palladium catalysts include those containing phosphine ligands such as [Pd(PPh_{3})_{4}]. Another commonly used palladium source is [Pd(PPh_{3})_{2}Cl_{2}], but complexes containing bidentate phosphine ligands, such as [Pd(dppe)Cl_{2}], [Pd(dppp)Cl_{2}], and [Pd(dppf)Cl_{2}] have also been used. The drawback to such catalysts is the need for high loadings of palladium (up to 5 mol %), along with a larger amount of a copper co-catalyst. Pd^{II} complexes are in fact pre-catalysts since they must be reduced to Pd^{0} before catalysis can begin. Pd^{II} complexes generally exhibit greater stability than Pd^{0} complexes and can be stored under normal laboratory conditions for months. Pd^{II} catalysts are reduced to Pd^{0} in the reaction mixture by an amine, a phosphine ligand, or another reactant in the mixture allowing the reaction to proceed. For instance, oxidation of triphenylphosphine to triphenylphosphine oxide can lead to the formation of Pd^{0} in situ when [Pd(PPh_{3})_{2}Cl_{2}] is used.

Copper(I) salts, such as CuI, react with the terminal alkyne and produce a copper(I) acetylide, which acts as an activated species for the coupling reactions. Cu(I) is a co-catalyst in the reaction, and is used to increase the rate of the reaction.

=== Aryl halides and pseudohalides ===
The choice of aryl halide or pseudohalide substrate (sp^{2}-carbon) is one of the factors that mainly influence the reactivity of the Sonogashira catalytic system. The reactivity of halides is higher towards iodine, and vinyl halides are more reactive than analogous aryl halides. The coupling of aryl iodides proceeds at room temperature, while aryl bromides require heating.

The rate of reaction of sp^{2} carbons. Vinyl iodide > vinyl triflate > vinyl bromide > vinyl chloride > aryl iodide > aryl triflate > aryl bromide >>> aryl chloride.

This difference in reactivity can be exploited to selectively couple an aryl iodide but not an aryl bromide, by performing the reaction at room temperature. An example is the symmetrical Sonogashira coupling of two equivalents of 1-bromo-4-iodobenzene with trimethylsilylacetylene (with the trimethylsilyl group removed in-situ) to form bis(4-bromophenyl)acetylene.

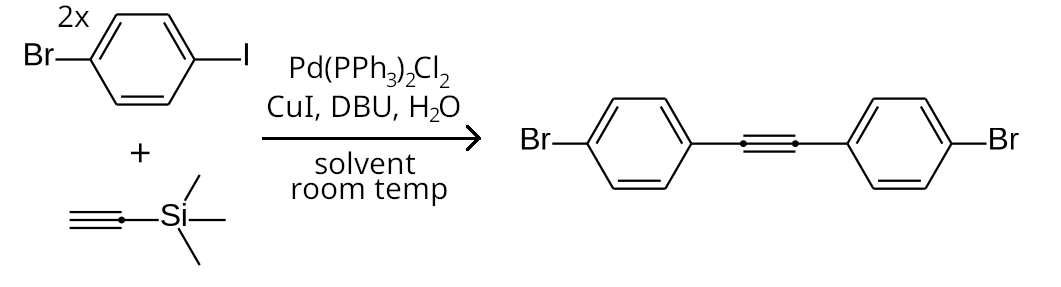
Symmetrical Sonogashira coupling of 1-bromo-4-iodobenzene with trimethylsilylacetylene with in situ TMSA deprotection to form bis(4-bromophenyl)acetylene.

Aryl triflates can also be employed instead of aryl halides.

==== Arenediazonium precursors ====
Arenediazonium salts have been reported as an alternative to aryl halides for the Sonogashira coupling reaction. Gold(I) chloride has been used as co-catalyst combined with palladium(II) chloride in the coupling of arenediazonium salts with terminal alkynes, a process carried out in the presence of bis-2,6-diisopropylphenyl dihydroimidazolium chloride (IPr NHC) (5 mol%) to in situ generate a NHC–palladium complex, and 2,6-di-tert-butyl-4-methylpyridine (DBMP) as base in acetonitrile as solvent at room temperature. This coupling can be carried out starting from anilines by formation of the diazonium salt followed by in situ Sonogashira coupling, where anilines are transformed into diazonium salt and furtherly converted into alkyne by coupling with phenylacetylene.

=== Alkynes ===
Various aromatic alkynes can be employed to yield desired disubstituted products with satisfactory yields. Aliphatic alkynes are generally less reactive.

=== Bases ===
Due to the crucial role of base, specific amines must be added in excess or as solvent for the reaction to proceed. It has been discovered that secondary amines such as piperidine, morpholine, or diisopropylamine in particular can react efficiently and reversibly with trans–RPdX(PPh_{3})_{2} complexes by substituting one PPh_{3} ligand. The equilibrium constant of this reaction is dependent on R, X, a factor for basicity, and the amine's steric hindrance. The result is competition between the amine and the alkyne group for this ligand exchange, which is why the amine is generally added in excess to promote preferential substitution.

=== Protecting groups ===
Trimethylsilylacetylene is a commonly used reagent in Sonogashira couplings. Being a liquid it is a more convenient reagent than the gaseous acetylene, and the trimethylsilyl group prevents addition onto the other end of the acetylene group. The trimethylsilyl group can then be removed using TBAF, yielding a monosubstituted acetylene. It may also be removed using DBU in situ, allowing the monosubstituted acetylene to react further with another aryl halide to form diphenylacetylene and derivatives.

== Reaction variations ==
=== Copper-free Sonogashira coupling ===
While a copper co-catalyst is added to the reaction to increase reactivity, the presence of copper can result in the formation of alkyne dimers. This leads to what is known as the Glaser coupling reaction, which is an undesired formation of homocoupling products of acetylene derivatives upon oxidation. As a result, when running a Sonogashira reaction with a copper co-catalyst, it is necessary to run the reaction in an inert atmosphere to avoid the unwanted dimerization. Copper-free variations to the Sonogashira reaction have been developed to avoid the formation of the homocoupling products. There are other cases when the use of copper should be avoided, such as coupling reactions involving substrates which potential copper ligands, for instance free-base porphyrins.

=== Inverse Sonogashira coupling ===
In an inverse Sonogashira coupling the reactants are an aryl or vinyl compound and an alkynyl halide.

=== Catalyst variations ===
==== Silver co-catalysis ====
In some cases stoichiometric amounts of silver oxide can be used in place of CuI for copper-free Sonogashira couplings.

==== Nickel catalysts ====
Recently, a nickel-catalyzed Sonogashira coupling has been developed which allows for the coupling of non-activated alkyl halides to acetylene without the use of palladium, although a copper co-catalyst is still needed. It has also been reported that gold can be used as a heterogeneous catalyst, which was demonstrated in the coupling of phenylacetylene and iodobenzene with an Au/CeO_{2} catalyst. In this case, catalysis occurs heterogeneously on the Au nanoparticles, with Au(0) as the active site. Selectivity to the desirable cross coupling product was also found to be enhanced by supports such as CeO_{2} and La_{2}O_{3}. Additionally, iron-catalyzed Sonogashira couplings have been investigated as relatively cheap and non-toxic alternatives to palladium. Here, FeCl_{3} is proposed to act as the transition-metal catalyst and Cs_{2}CO_{3} as the base, thus theoretically proceeding through a palladium-free and copper-free mechanism.

$$\begin{array}{c} {} \\ {\color{Blue}\ce{R}-\!\!\!{\equiv}\!}\ce{-H} + {\color{Red}\ce{Ar}-\!\!\!{\equiv}\!-}\ce{X ->[\ce{FeCl3}\text{, DMEDA}][\begin{matrix}\ce{Cs2CO3}\text{, toluene} \\ 135^\circ\text{C, 72h} \end{matrix}]} \ {\color{Blue}\ce{R}-\!\!\!{\equiv}\!}{\color{Red}\ce{-H}} \end{array}$$

Palladium-free Sonogashira reaction catalysed by iron

While the copper-free mechanism has been shown to be viable, attempts to incorporate the various transition metals mentioned above as less expensive alternatives to palladium catalysts have shown a poor track record of success due to contamination of the reagents with trace amounts of palladium, suggesting that these theorized pathways are extremely unlikely, if not impossible, to achieve.

Studies have shown that organic and inorganic starting materials can also contain enough (ppb level) palladium for the coupling.

==== Gold and palladium co-catalysis ====
A highly efficient gold and palladium combined methodology for the Sonogashira coupling of a wide array of electronically and structurally diverse aryl and heteroaryl halides has been reported. The orthogonal reactivity of the two metals shows high selectivity and extreme functional group tolerance in Sonogashira coupling. A brief mechanistic study reveals that the gold-acetylide intermediate enters into palladium catalytic cycle at the transmetalation step.

==== Dendrimeric palladium complexes ====
The issues dealing with recovery of the often expensive catalyst after product formation poses a serious drawback for large-scale applications of homogeneous catalysis. Structures known as metallodendrimers combine the advantages of homogeneous and heterogeneous catalysts, as they are soluble and well defined on the molecular level, and yet they can be recovered by precipitation, ultrafiltration, or ultracentrifugation. Some recent examples can be found about the use of dendritic palladium complex catalysts for the copper-free Sonogashira reaction. Thus, several generations of bidentate phosphine palladium(II) polyamino dendritic catalysts have been used solubilized in triethylamine for the coupling of aryl iodides and bromides at 25-120 °C, and of aryl chlorides, but in very low yields.

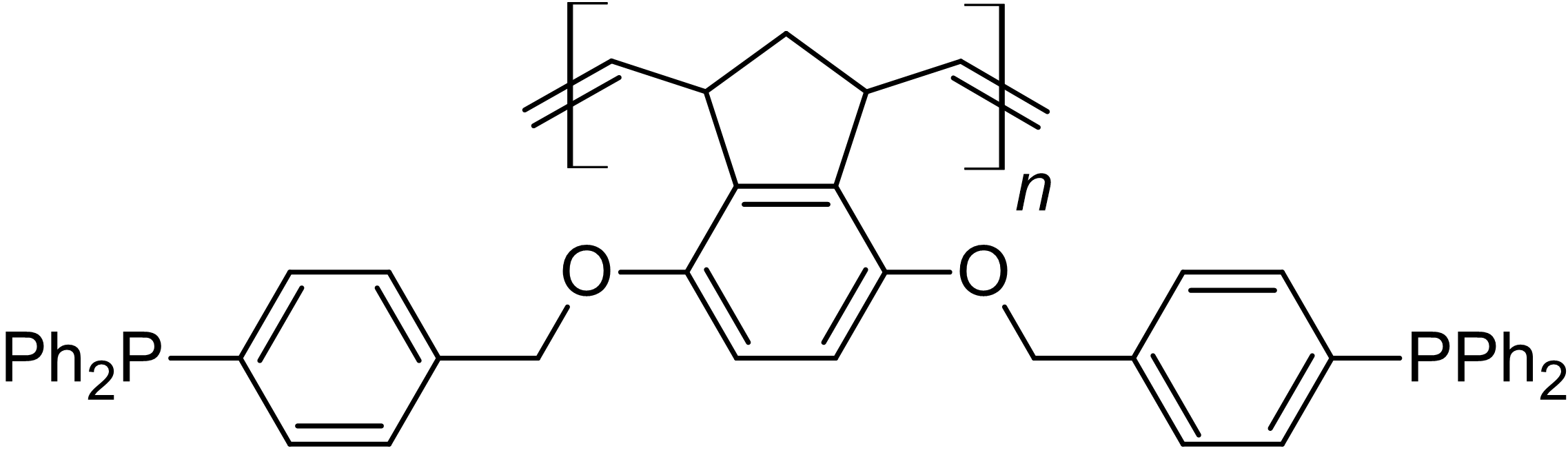
A recyclable polymeric phosphine ligand

The dendrimeric catalysts could usually be recovered by simple precipitation and filtration and reused up to five times, with diminished activity produced by dendrimer decomposition and not by palladium leaching being observed. These dendrimeric catalysts showed a negative dendritic effect; that is, the catalyst efficiency decreases as the dendrimer generation increases. A recyclable polymeric phosphine ligand is obtained from ring-opening metathesis polymerization of a norbornene derivative, and has been used in the copper co-catalyzed Sonogashira reaction of methyl p-iodobenzoate and phenylacetylene using Pd(dba)_{2}·CHCl_{3} as a palladium source. Despite recovery by filtration, polymer catalytic activity decreased by approximately 4-8% in each recycle experiment.

==== Nitrogen ligands ====
Pyridines and pyrimidines have shown good complexation properties for palladium and have been employed in the formation of catalysts suitable for Sonogashira couplings. The dipyrimidyl-palladium complex shown below has been employed in the copper-free coupling of iodo-, bromo-, and chlorobenzene with phenylacetylene using N-butylamine as base in THF solvent at 65 °C. Furthermore, all structural features of this complex have been characterized by extensive X-ray analysis, verifying the observed reactivity.

More recently, the dipyridylpalladium complex has been obtained and has been used in the copper-free Sonogashira coupling reaction of aryl iodides and bromides in N-methylpyrrolidinone (NMP) using tetra-n-butylammonium acetate (TBAA) as base at room temperature. This complex has also been used for the coupling of aryl iodides and bromides in refluxing water as solvent and in the presence of air, using pyrrolidine as base and TBAB as additive, although its efficiency was higher in N-methylpyrrolidinone (NMP) as solvent.

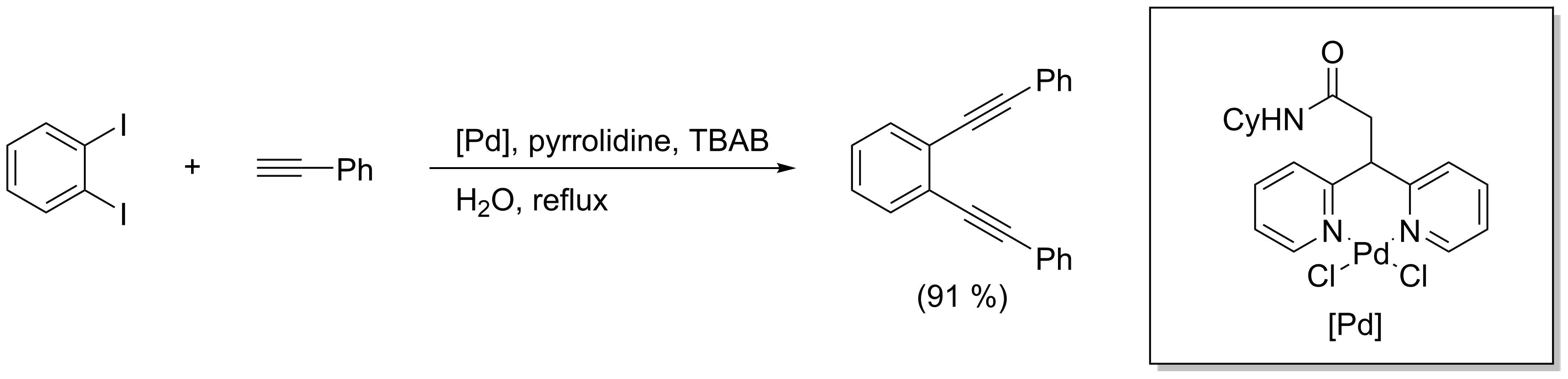
Coupling of a diiodo substrate catalysed by the dipyridylpalladium complex.

==== N-heterocyclic carbene (NHC) palladium complexes ====
N-heterocyclic carbenes (NHCs) have become one of the most important ligands in transition-metal catalysis. The success of normal NHCs is greatly attributed to their superior σ-donating capabilities as compared to phosphines, which is even greater in abnormal NHC counterparts. Employed as ligands in palladium complexes, NHCs contributed greatly to the stabilization and activation of precatalysts and have therefore found application in many areas of organometallic homogeneous catalysis, including Sonogashira couplings.

| An example of palladium(II) derived complex with N-heterocyclic ligand | An example of cationic PdNHC complex for efficient catalysis of Sonogashira reaction in water. |
| An example of palladium(II) derived complex with normal NHC ligand. | Efficient iPEPPSI catalyst for Cu-free Sonogashira reaction in water. |

Interesting examples of abnormal NHCs are based on the mesoionic 1,2,3-triazol-5-ylidene structure. An efficient, cationic palladium catalyst of PEPPSI type, i.e., iPEPPSI (internal pyridine-enhanced precatalyst preparation stabilization and initiation) was demonstrated to efficiently catalyse the copper-free Sonogashira reaction in water as the only solvent, under aerobic conditions, in the absence of copper, amines, phosphines and other additives.

==== Metal oxide catalysts ====
Recent developments in heterogeneous catalysis enabled the use of metal oxide materials such as cuprous oxide nanocatalysts in flow processing technologies, which can enable the economical production of active pharmaceutical ingredients and various other fine chemicals.

== Applications in synthesis ==
Sonogashira couplings are employed in a wide array of synthetic reactions, primarily due to their success in facilitating the following challenging transformations:

=== Alkynylation reactions ===
The coupling of a terminal alkyne and an aromatic ring is the pivotal reaction when talking about applications of the copper-promoted or copper-free Sonogashira reaction. The list of cases where the typical Sonogashira reaction using aryl halides has been employed is large, and choosing illustrative examples is difficult. A recent use of this methodology is shown below for the coupling of iodinated phenylalanine with a terminal alkyne derived from d-biotin using an in situ generated Pd^{0} species as catalyst, which allowed the preparation of alkyne-linked phenylalanine derivative for bioanalytical applications. There are also examples of the coupling partners both being attached to allyl resins, with the Pd^{0} catalyst effecting cleavage of the substrates and subsequent Sonogashira coupling in solution.

Alkynylation of phenylalanine.

=== Natural products ===
Many metabolites found in nature contain alkyne or enyne moieties, and therefore, the Sonogashira reaction has found frequent utility in their syntheses. Several of the most recent and promising applications of this coupling methodology toward the total synthesis of natural products exclusively employed the typical copper-cocatalyzed reaction.

An example of the coupling of an aryl iodide to an aryl acetylene can be seen in the reaction of an iodinated alcohol and tris(isopropyl)silylacetylene, which gave an alkyne, an intermediate in the total synthesis of the benzindenoazepine alkaloid bulgaramine.

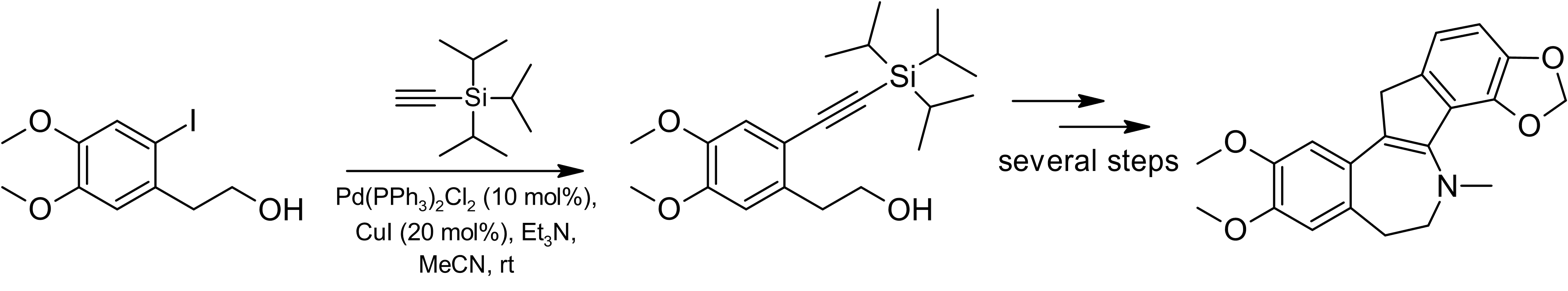
Sonogashira reaction in the total synthesis of bulgaramine.

There are other recent examples of the use of aryl iodides for the preparation of intermediates under typical Sonogashira conditions, which, after cyclization, yield natural products such as benzylisoquinoline or indole alkaloids An example is the synthesis of the benzylisoquinoline alkaloids (+)-(S)-laudanosine and (–)-(S)-xylopinine. The synthesis of these natural products involved the use of Sonogashira cross-coupling to build the carbon backbone of each molecule.

Natural products (+)-(S)-laudanosine and (–)-(S)-xylopinine synthesized using the Sonogashira cross-coupling reaction.

==== Enynes and enediynes ====
The 1,3-enyne moiety is an important structural unit for biologically active and natural compounds. It can be derived from vinylic systems and terminal acetylenes by using a configuration-retention stereospecific procedure such as the Sonogashira reaction. Vinyl iodides are the most reactive vinyl halides to Pd^{0} oxidative addition, and their use is therefore most frequent for Sonogashira cross-coupling reactions due to the usually milder conditions employed. Some examples include:

- The coupling of 2-iodoprop-2-en-1-ol with a wide range of acetylenes.
- The preparation of alk-2-ynylbuta-1,3-dienes from the cross-coupling of a diiodide and phenylacetylene, as shown below.

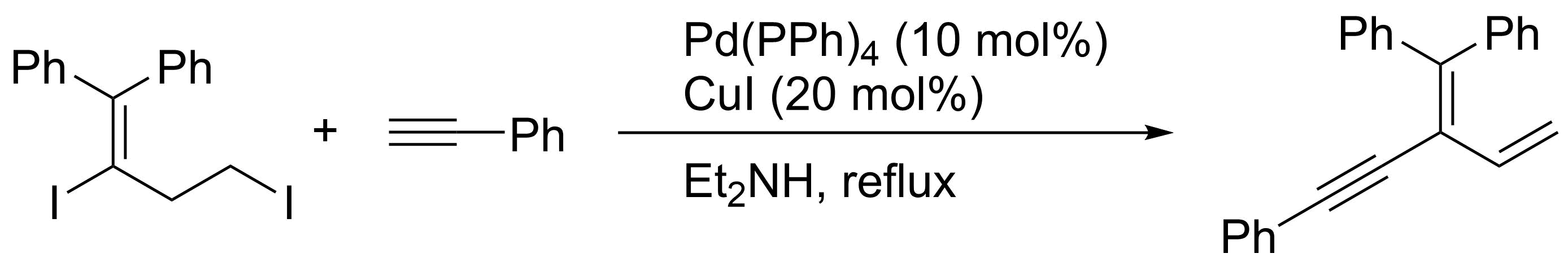
Synthesis of an alk-2-ynylbuta-1,3-diene accomplished by Sonogashira coupling.

==== Pharmaceuticals ====
The versatility of the Sonogashira reaction makes it a widely used reaction in the synthesis of a variety of compounds. One such pharmaceutical application is in the synthesis of SIB-1508Y, which is more commonly known as Altinicline. Altinicline is a nicotinic acetylcholine receptor agonist that has shown potential in the treatment of Parkinson's disease, Alzheimer's disease, Tourette's syndrome, schizophrenia, and attention deficit hyperactivity disorder (ADHD). As of 2008, Altinicline has undergone Phase II clinical trials.

Use of the Sonogashira cross-coupling reaction in the synthesis of SIB-1508Y.

The Sonogashira cross coupling reaction can be used in the synthesis of imidazopyridine derivatives.

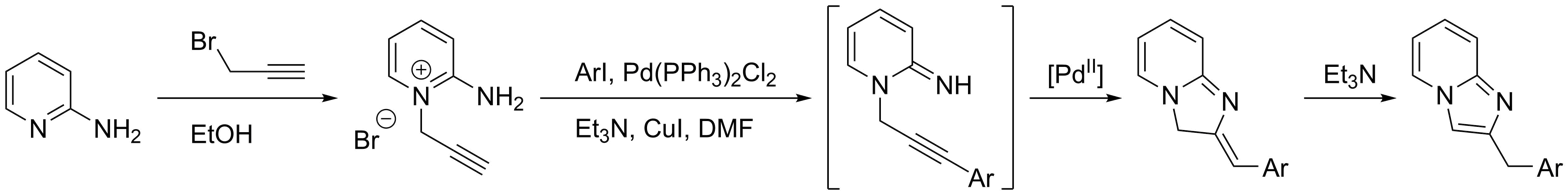
Synthesis of imidazopyridine derivatives.

Other applications: JNJ-7925476, Sazetidine A (Saz A), VMY-2-95 [1434047-61-6], LF-3-88 & LF-3-80, MTEP, MFZ 10-7, GRN-529, Raseglurant, Dipraglurant & Mepanipyrim.

== Related reactions ==
- Cross-coupling reactions
  - Castro-Stephens coupling
  - Heck reaction
  - Stille reaction
  - Suzuki reaction
  - Negishi coupling
  - Kumada coupling
- Transmetalation
