= Heck reaction =

Coupling reaction

Named after	Richard F. Heck
Reaction type	Coupling reaction

Identifiers
Organic Chemistry Portal	heck-reaction
RSC ontology ID	RXNO:0000024

The Heck reaction (also called the Mizoroki–Heck reaction) is the chemical reaction of an unsaturated halide (or triflate) with an alkene in the presence of a base and a palladium catalyst to form a substituted alkene. It is named after Tsutomu Mizoroki and Richard F. Heck. Heck was awarded the 2010 Nobel Prize in Chemistry, which he shared with Ei-ichi Negishi and Akira Suzuki, for the discovery and development of this reaction. This reaction was the first example of a carbon-carbon bond-forming reaction that followed a Pd(0)/Pd(II) catalytic cycle, the same catalytic cycle that is seen in other Pd(0)-catalyzed cross-coupling reactions. The Heck reaction is a way to substitute alkenes.

The Heck reaction

The Heck reaction

== History ==
The original reaction by Tsutomu Mizoroki (1971) describes the coupling between iodobenzene and styrene in methanol to form stilbene at 120 °C (autoclave) with potassium acetate base and palladium chloride catalysis. This work was an extension of earlier work by Fujiwara (1967) on the Pd(II)-mediated coupling of arenes (Ar–H) and alkenes and earlier work by Heck (1969) on the coupling of arylmercuric halides (ArHgCl) with alkenes using a stoichiometric amount of a palladium(II) species.

Mizoroki 1971

Mizoroki 1971

In 1972 Heck acknowledged the Mizoroki publication and detailed independently discovered work. Heck's reaction conditions differ in terms of the catalyst (palladium acetate), catalyst loading (0.01 eq.), base (hindered amine), and absence of solvent.

Heck 1972

Heck 1972

In 1974 Heck showed that phosphine ligands facilitated the reaction.

Dieck & Heck 1974

Heck reaction 1974 phosphines

== Catalyst and substrates ==
The reaction is catalyzed by palladium complexes. Typical catalysts and precatalysts include tetrakis(triphenylphosphine)palladium(0), palladium chloride, and palladium(II) acetate. Typical supporting ligands are triphenylphosphine, PHOX, and BINAP. Typical bases are triethylamine, potassium carbonate, and sodium acetate.

The aryl electrophile can be a halide (Br, Cl) or a triflate as well as benzyl or vinyl halides. The alkene must contain at least one sp^{2}-C-H bond. Electron-withdrawing substituents enhance the reaction, thus acrylates are ideal.

== Reaction mechanism ==
The mechanism of this vinylation involves organopalladium intermediates. The required palladium(0) compound is often generated in situ from a palladium(II) precursor.

For instance, palladium(II) acetate is reduced by triphenylphosphine to bis(triphenylphosphine)palladium(0) (1) concomitant with oxidation of triphenylphosphine to triphenylphosphine oxide. Step A is an oxidative addition in which palladium inserts itself in the aryl-bromide bond. The resulting palladium(II) complex then binds alkene (3). In step B the alkene inserts into the Pd-C bond in a syn addition step. Step C involves a beta-hydride elimination (here the arrows are showing the opposite) with the formation of a new palladium - alkene π complex (5). This complex is destroyed in the next step. The Pd(0) complex is regenerated by reductive elimination of the palladium(II) compound by potassium carbonate in the final step, D. In the course of the reaction the carbonate is stoichiometrically consumed and palladium is truly a catalyst and used in catalytic amounts. A similar palladium cycle but with different scenes and actors is observed in the Wacker process.

Heck Reaction Mechanism

Heck Reaction Mechanism

This cycle is not limited to vinyl compounds, in the Sonogashira coupling one of the reactants is an alkyne and in the Suzuki coupling the alkene is replaced by an aryl boronic acid and in the Stille reaction by an aryl stannane. The cycle also extends to the other group 10 element nickel for example in the Negishi coupling between aryl halides and organozinc compounds. Platinum forms strong bonds with carbon and does not have a catalytic activity in this type of reaction.

== Stereoselectivity ==
This coupling reaction is stereoselective with a propensity for trans coupling as the palladium halide group and the bulky organic residue move away from each other in the reaction sequence in a rotation step. The Heck reaction is applied industrially in the production of naproxen and the sunscreen component octyl methoxycinnamate. The naproxen synthesis includes a coupling between a brominated naphthalene compound with ethylene:

The Heck reaction in Naproxen production

The Heck reaction in Naproxen production

== Variations ==
=== Ionic liquid Heck reaction ===
In the presence of an ionic liquid a Heck reaction proceeds in absence of a phosphorus ligand. In one modification palladium acetate and the ionic liquid (bmim)PF_{6} are immobilized inside the cavities of reversed-phase silica gel. In this way the reaction proceeds in water and the catalyst is re-usable.

Siloxane application

Siloxane application

=== Heck oxyarylation ===
In the Heck oxyarylation modification the palladium substituent in the syn-addition intermediate is displaced by a hydroxyl group and the reaction product contains a dihydrofuran ring.

Heck oxyarylation

Heck oxyarylation

=== Amino-Heck reaction ===
In the amino-Heck reaction a nitrogen to carbon bond is formed. In one example, an oxime with a strongly electron withdrawing group reacts intramolecularly with the end of a diene to form a pyridine compound. The catalyst is tetrakis(triphenylphosphine)palladium(0) and the base is triethylamine.

Amino-Heck reaction

Amino-Heck reaction

== See also ==
- Hiyama coupling
- Stille reaction
- Suzuki reaction
- Sonogashira coupling
- Intramolecular Heck reaction
- Negishi Coupling
