= Castro–Stephens coupling =

Chemical reaction

Named after	Charles E. Castro; Robert D. Stephens
Reaction type	Coupling reaction

Identifiers
RSC ontology ID	RXNO:0000525

The Castro–Stephens coupling is a cross coupling reaction between a copper(I) acetylide and an aryl halide in pyridine, forming a disubstituted alkyne and a copper(I) halide.

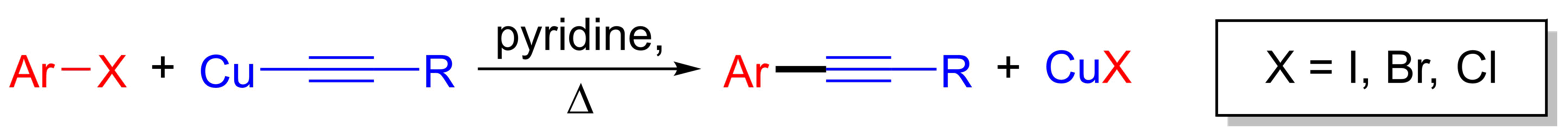

The reaction was described in 1963 by chemists Castro and Stephens. The reaction is similar to the much older Rosenmund–von Braun synthesis (1914) between aryl halides and copper(I) cyanide and was itself modified in 1975 as the Sonogashira coupling by adding a palladium catalyst and preparing the organocopper compound in situ, allowing copper to also be used catalytically.

A typical reaction diphenylacetylene is obtained by the coupling of iodobenzene with CuC_{2}C_{6}H_{5} in hot pyridine:

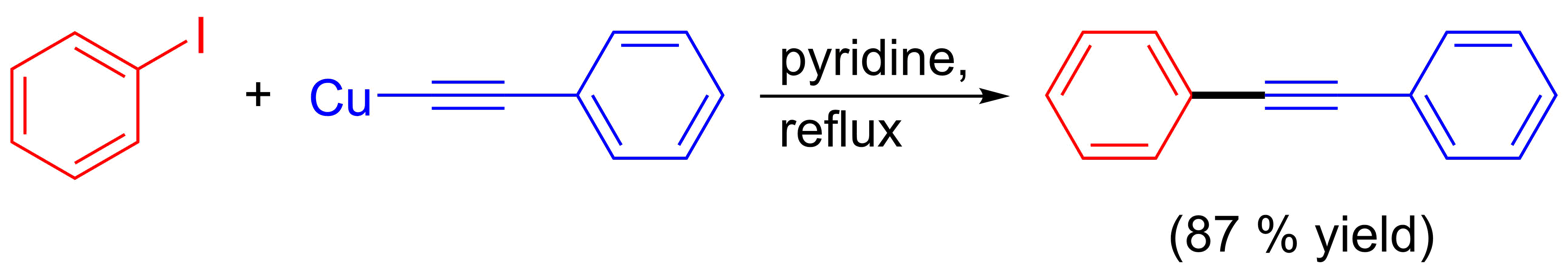

Unlike the Sonogashira coupling, the Castro–Stephens coupling can produce heterocyclic compounds when a nucleophilic group is ortho to the aryl halide, although this typically requires use of dimethylformamide (DMF) as solvent.

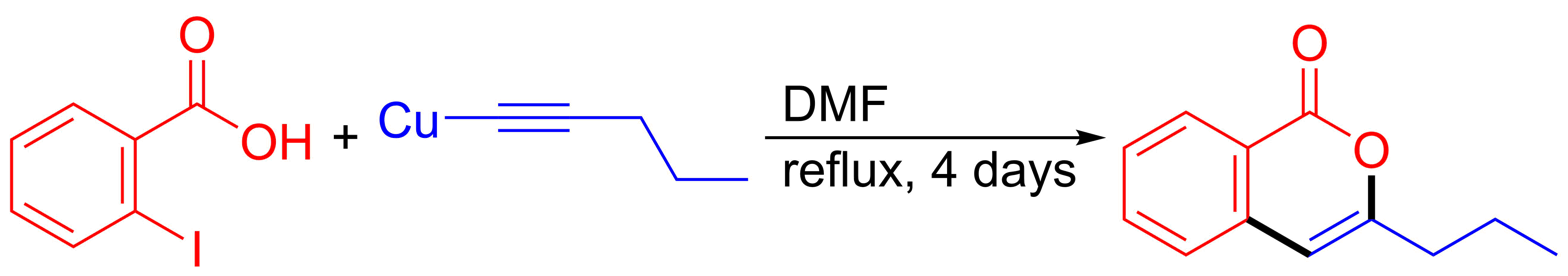
