= Akira Suzuki =

Japanese chemist (born 1930)

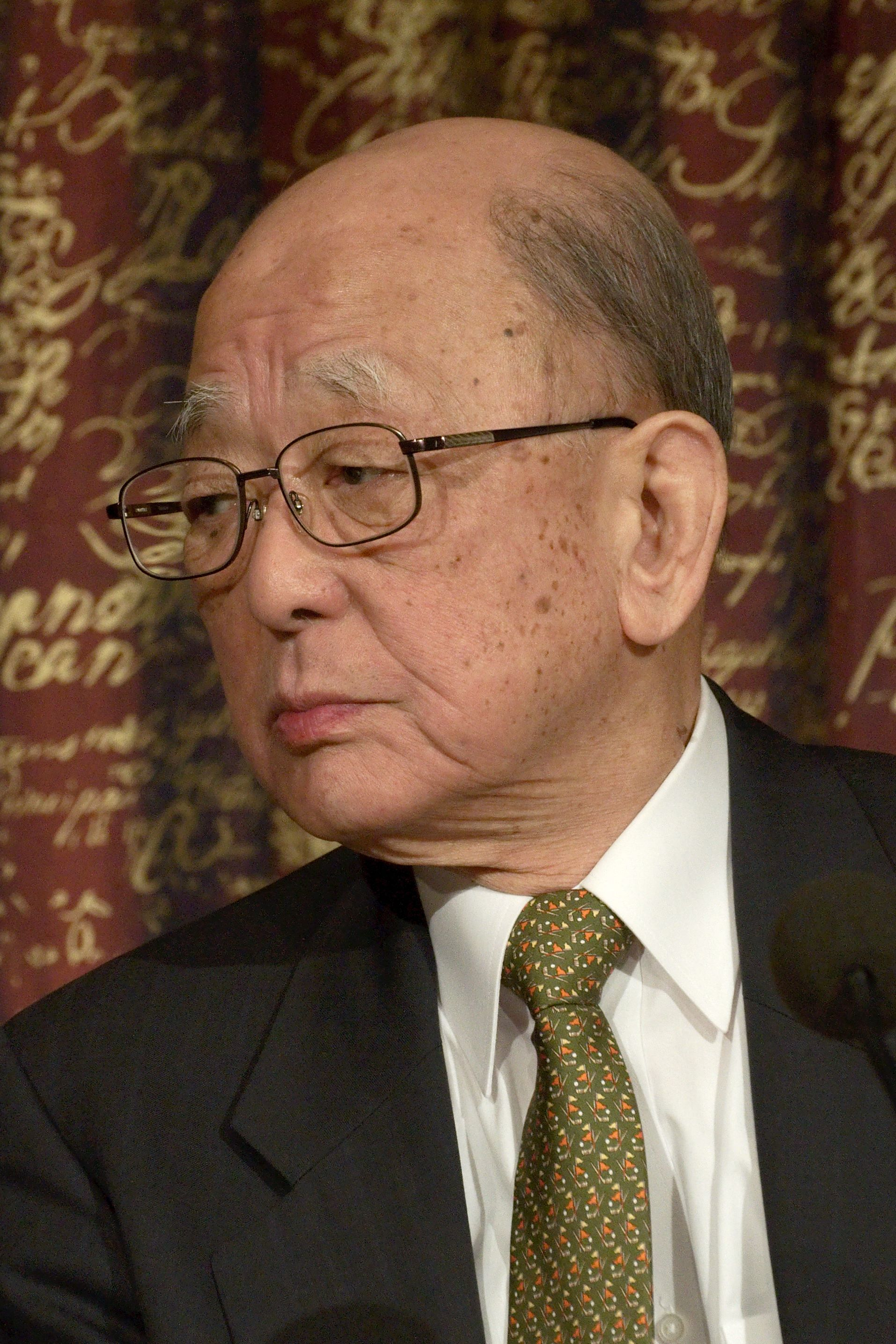
- Suzuki in 2010
- Born: September 12, 1930 (age 96); Mukawa, Hokkaido, Japan
- Education: Hokkaido University
- Known for: Suzuki reaction
- Awards: Japan Academy Prize (2003); Paul Karrer Gold Medal (2009); Nobel Prize for Chemistry (2010); Person of Cultural Merit (2010); Order of Culture (2010)
- Scientific career
- Workplaces: Hokkaido University; Purdue University; University of Wales; Okayama University of Science; Kurashiki University of Science and the Arts

Akira Suzuki (鈴木 章, Suzuki Akira; born September 12, 1930) is a Japanese chemist and Nobel Prize Laureate (2010), who first published the Suzuki reaction, the organic reaction of an aryl- or vinyl-boronic acid with an aryl- or vinyl-halide catalyzed by a palladium(0) complex, in 1979.

== Early life and education ==
Suzuki was born on September 12, 1930, in Mukawa, Hokkaidō, his father died when he was in high school. He studied chemistry at Hokkaido University (Hokudai) and after receiving his PhD while he worked there as assistant professor. He initially wanted to major in mathematics, as his favorite subject in childhood was arithmetic. It was an encounter with two books that became an opportunity to advance to the path of organic synthesis, one is Textbook of Organic Chemistry written by Louis Fieser of Harvard University, and another is Hydroboration written by Herbert C. Brown of Purdue University.

== Career ==
From 1963 until 1965, Suzuki worked as a postdoctoral student with Herbert C. Brown at Purdue University and after returning to the Hokudai he became a full professor there. The postdoctoral experience was utilized in the study of the coupling reaction with his assistant Norio Miyaura and led to the discovery of Suzuki reaction announced in 1979. Its organic boronic acids with aryl and vinyl group are stable to water and air, easy to handle, and because the conditions required for use are also relatively mild, even among the several cross-coupling techniques, it is said to be easy to use. Its full mechanism is shown in the image below.

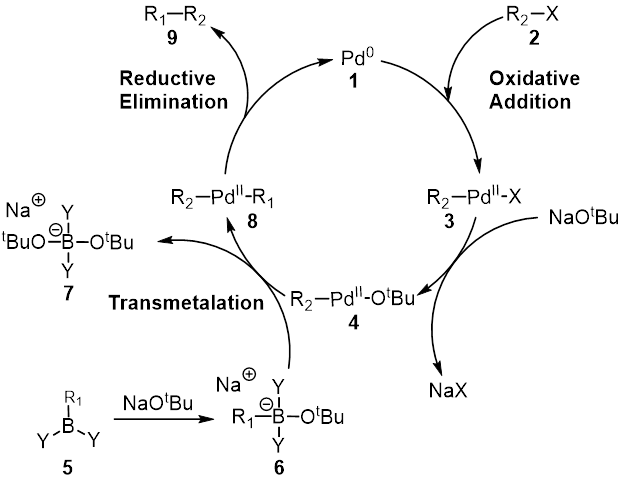
Suzuki Coupling Full Mechanism 2

With his retirement from Hokudai in 1994 he took several positions in other universities: 1994–1995 Okayama University of Science and 1995–2002 Kurashiki University of Science and the Arts. In addition, he was an invited professor at Purdue University (2001), Academic Sinica and the National Taiwan University (2002).

In 2010, Suzuki was jointly awarded the Nobel Prize for Chemistry together with Richard F. Heck and Ei-ichi Negishi.

To celebrate International Year of Chemistry (IYC 2011), Suzuki was interviewed by the UNESCO Courier magazine, he said：

Today some people see chemistry just as a polluting industry, but that is a mistake ... Without it, productivity would drop and we could not enjoy the life we know today. If there is pollution, it is because we are releasing harmful substances. Obviously, we have to adapt treatment and management regimes and work to develop chemical substances and manufacturing processes that respect the environment.

In 2014, a Canadian-Chinese student asked for Suzuki's advice: "how can I become a great chemist like you?", Suzuki answered him: "... above all else, you must learn to see through the appearance to perceive the essence."

== Invention without patent ==
Suzuki has not obtained a patent on Suzuki reaction technology because he thinks that the research was supported by government funds, therefore coupling technology has become widespread, and many products using this technology have been put into practical use. To date, there are more than 6,000 papers and patents related to Suzuki reaction.

== Recognition ==
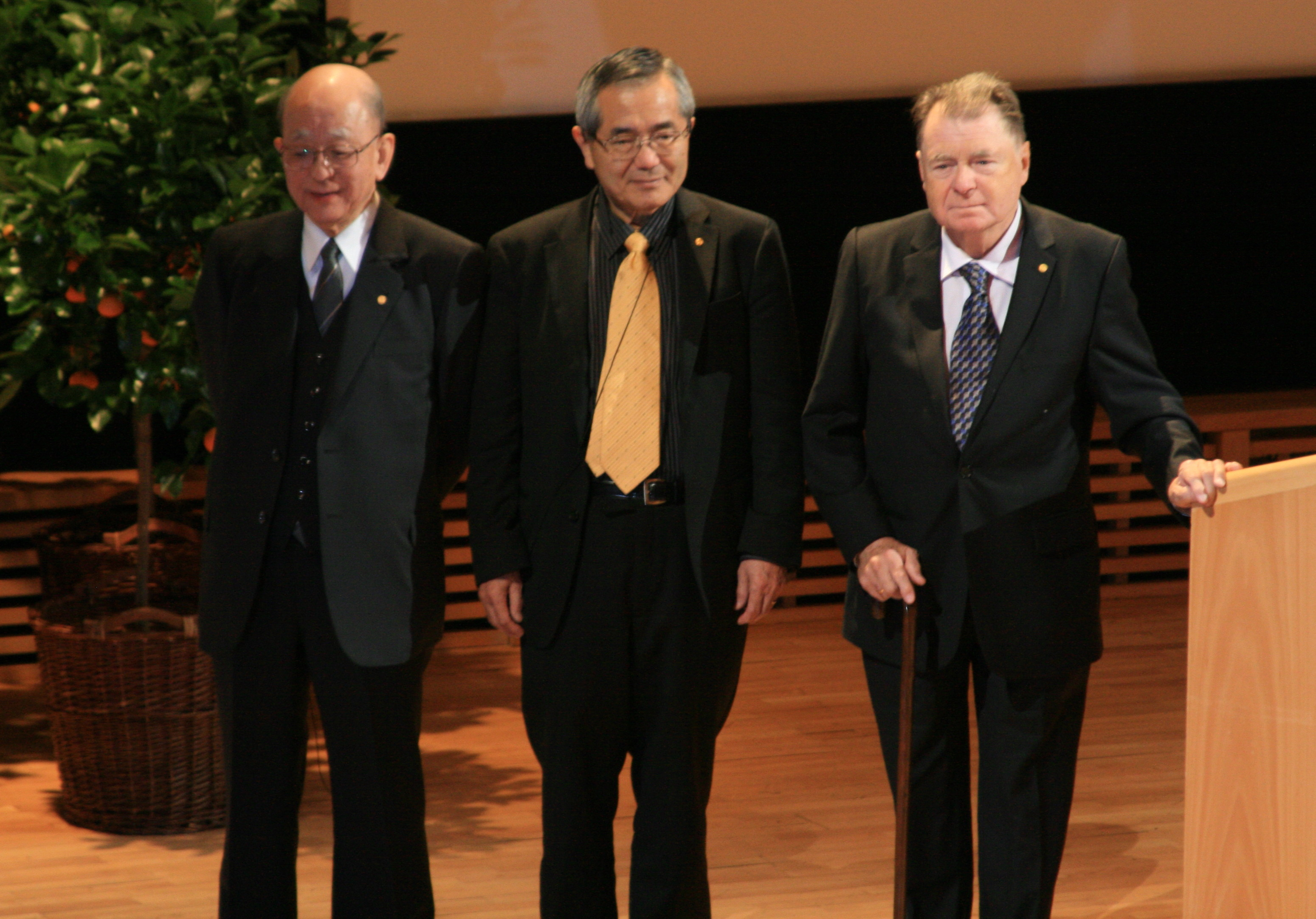
From left: Suzuki, Negishi, and Heck (2010)

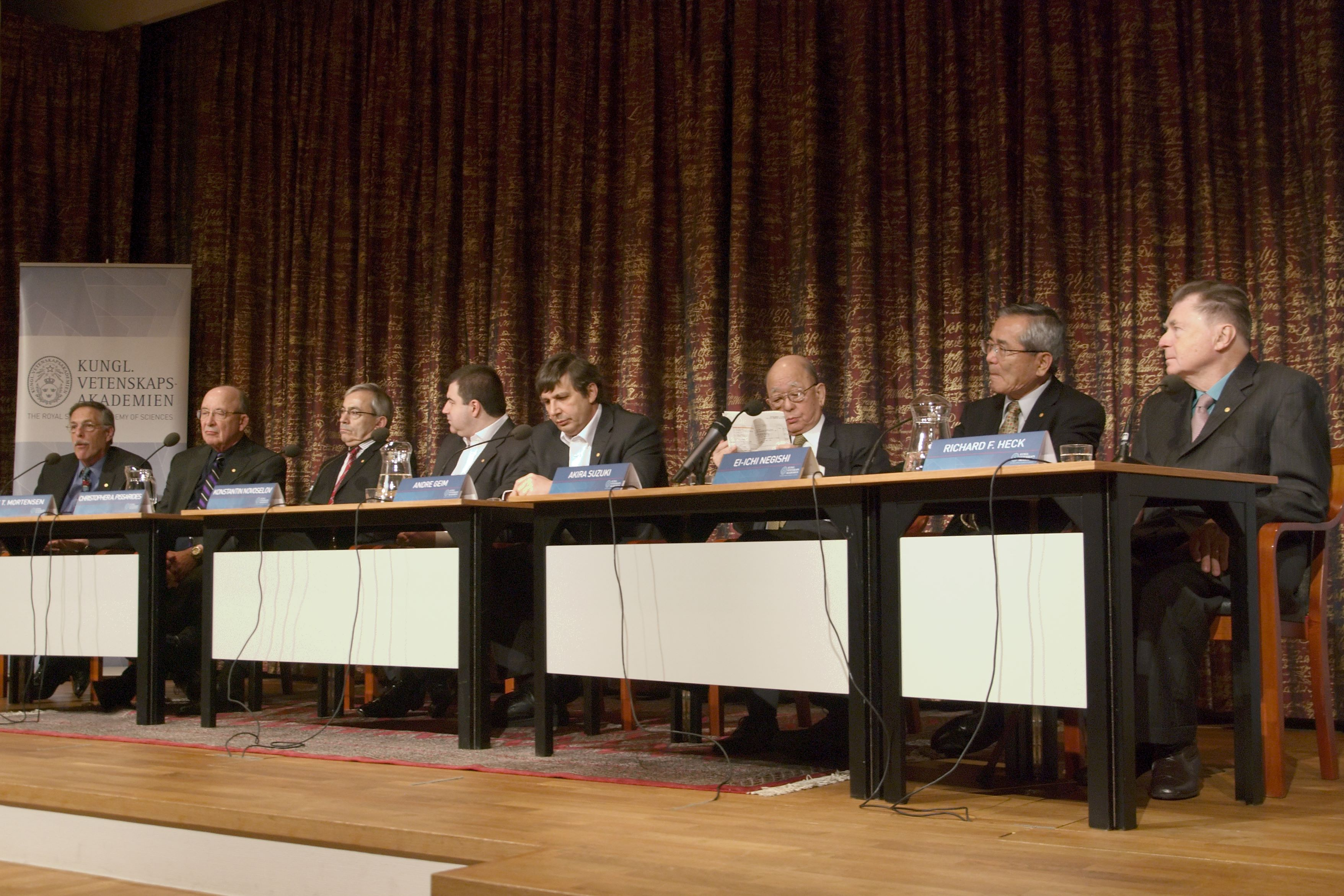
Peter Diamond, Dale T. Mortensen, Christopher A. Pissarides, Konstantin Novoselov, Andre Geim, Akira Suzuki, Ei-ichi Negishi, and Richard Heck, Nobel Prize Laureates 2010, at a press conference at the Royal Swedish Academy of Sciences in Stockholm.

The asteroid 87312 Akirasuzuki was named after Professor Suzuki.

- 1986 – Weissberger-Williams lectureship Award
- 1987 – Korean Chemical Society Award
- 1989 – Chemical Society of Japan Award
- 1995 – DowElanco lectureship Award
- 2000 – The H. C. Brown Lecture Award
- 2003 – Japan Academy Prize
- 2009 – Paul Karrer Gold Medal
- 2009 – Special Member of Royal Society of Chemistry (RSC)
- 2010 – Nobel Prize in Chemistry
- 2010 – Order of Culture
- 2010 – Person of Cultural Merit
- 2011 – Member of the Japan Academy
- 2011 – honored on a stamp issued by Republic of the Congo
- 2016 – Honorary chair professorship, National Cheng Kung University

== See also ==
- List of Japanese Nobel laureates
- Richard F. Heck
- Ei-ichi Negishi
- Makoto Kumada
- Kenkichi Sonogashira
