= Makoto Kumada =

Japanese chemist (1920–2007)

- Born: January 17, 1920
- Died: June 28, 2007 (aged 87)
- Education: Kyoto University
- Known for: Kumada coupling
- Scientific career
- Workplaces: Kyoto University, Toshiba, Osaka City University, Kyoto University

Makoto Kumada (熊田 誠, Kumada Makoto; 17 January 1920 – 28 June 2007) was a Japanese chemist and was a Professor of Chemistry first at Osaka City University until his retirement in 1983 at Kyoto University in Japan. In 1972, Kumada's group reported nickel-catalyzed cross coupling reactions nearly concurrently with the Corriu group working in France. The Kumada coupling now bears his name.

In an interview after the 2010 Nobel Prize in Chemistry was announced, Nobel Committee member Jan Bekvall (professor at Stockholm University) said: "If Professor Kumada been alive, he could have won this year's Nobel Prize for his work in developing cross-coupling."

== See also ==
- Richard F. Heck
- Ei-ichi Negishi
- Akira Suzuki
- Kenkichi Sonogashira
