= Kurashiki University of Science and the Arts =

University in Okayama Prefecture, Japan

Coordinates: 34°33′22″N 133°42′42″E

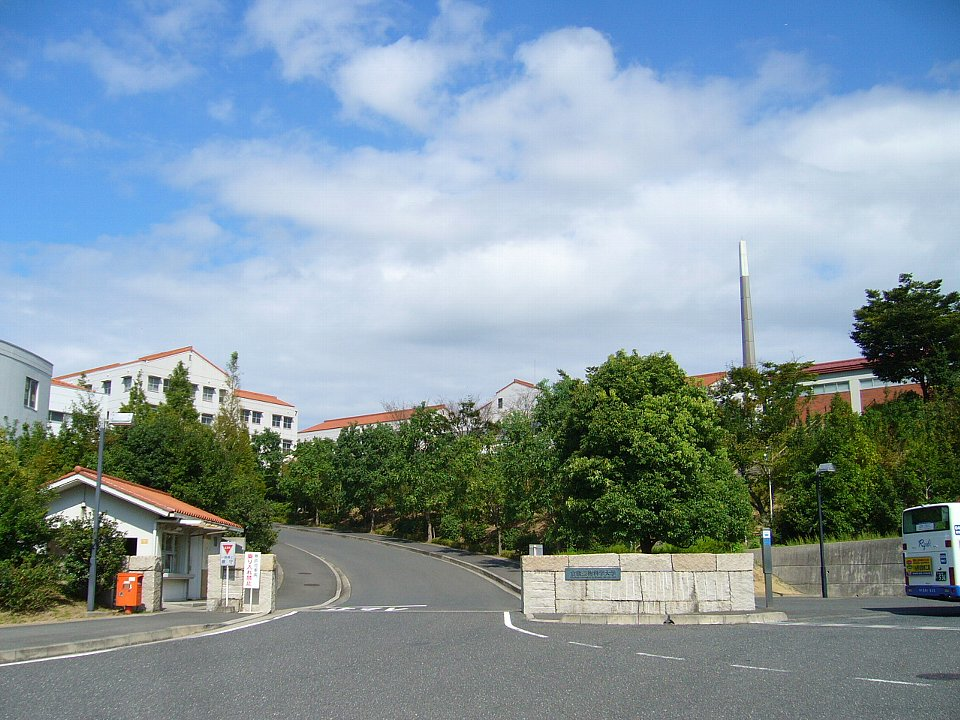
Kurashiki University of Science and the Arts

Kurashiki University of Science and the Arts (倉敷芸術科学大学, Kurashiki geijutsu daigaku) is a private university in Kurashiki, Okayama, Japan, established in 1995. Currently part of the Kake Gakuen
