= Altinicline =

Chemical compound

Clinical data
- ATC code: None

Identifiers
- IUPAC name: (2S)-3-ethynyl-5-(1-methylpyrrolidin-2-yl)pyridine
- CAS Number: 179120-92-4
- PubChem CID: 3036156
- ChemSpider: 2300234
- UNII: RJ9V9V09VM
- ChEMBL: ChEMBL111659
- CompTox Dashboard (EPA): DTXSID40870143

Chemical and physical data
- Formula: C_{12}H_{14}N_{2}
- Molar mass: 186.258 g·mol^{−1}
- 3D model (JSmol): Interactive image
- SMILES: c2ncc(C#C)cc2C1CCCN1C
- InChI: InChI=1S/C12H14N2/c1-3-10-7-11(9-13-8-10)12-5-4-6-14(12)2/h1,7-9,12H,4-6H2,2H3/t12-/m0/s1; Key:NUPUDYKEEJNZRG-LBPRGKRZSA-N

Altinicline (SIB-1508Y, SIB-1765F) is a drug which acts as an agonist at neural nicotinic acetylcholine receptors with high selectivity for the α4β2 subtype. It stimulates release of dopamine and acetylcholine in the brain in both rodent and primate models, and progressed as far as Phase II clinical trials for Parkinson's disease, where "no antiparkinsonian or cognitive-enhancing effects were demonstrated", although its current status is unclear.
