= Cross-coupling partner =

Reagents in cross-coupling reactions

In cross-coupling reactions, the component reagents are called cross-coupling partners or simply coupling partners. These reagents can be further classified according to their nucleophilic vs electrophilic character:

R-X + R'-Y → R-R' + XY

Typically the electrophilic coupling partner (R-X) is an aryl halide, but triflates are also used. Nucleophilic coupling (R'-Y) partners are more diverse. In the Suzuki reaction, boronic esters and boronic acids serve as nucleophilic coupling partners. Expanding the scope of coupling partners is a focus methods development in organic synthesis.
