= Ei-ichi Negishi =

Japanese chemist and Nobel laureate (1935–2021)

- 根岸英一
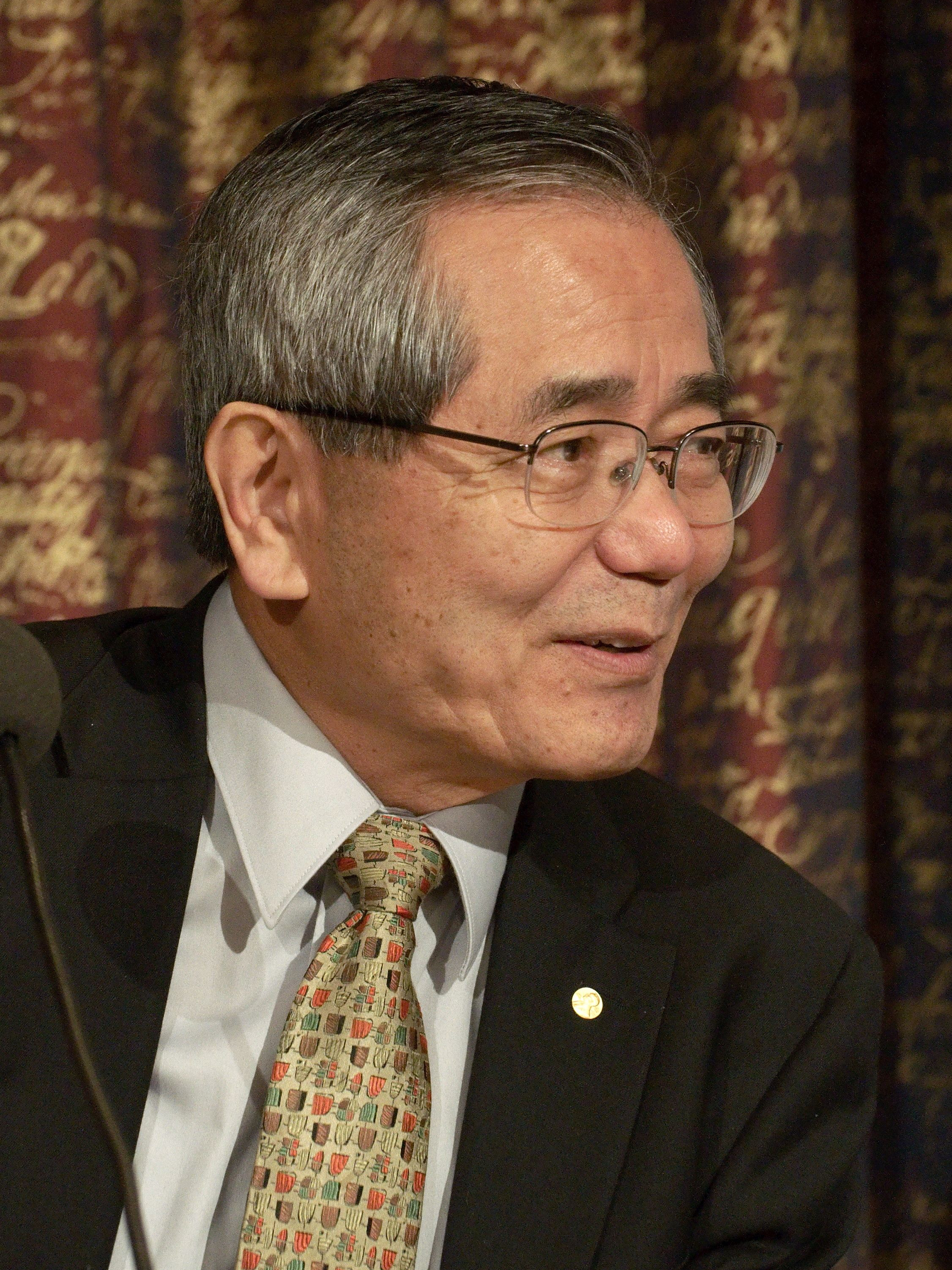
- Negishi in 2010
- Born: July 14, 1935; Xinjing, Manchukuo (modern Changchun, China)
- Died: June 6, 2021 (aged 85); Indianapolis, Indiana, U.S.
- Education: University of Tokyo; University of Pennsylvania
- Known for: Negishi coupling ZACA reaction
- Spouse: Sumire Suzuki (m. 1959; died 2018)
- Children: 2
- Awards: Sir Edward Frankland Prize Lectureship (2000); Nobel Prize in Chemistry (2010); Person of Cultural Merit (2010); Order of Culture (2010)
- Scientific career
- Fields: Chemistry
- Workplaces: Teijin; Purdue University; Syracuse University; Hokkaido University
- Thesis: Basic cleavage of arylsulfonamides, the synthesis of some bicyclic compounds derived from piperazine which contain bridgehead nitrogen atoms. (1963)
- Doctoral advisor: Allan R. Day
- Doctoral students: James M. Tour

Ei-ichi Negishi (根岸 英一, Negishi Eiichi; 14 July 1935 – 6 June 2021) was a Japanese chemist who was best known for his discovery of the Negishi coupling. He spent most of his career at Purdue University in the United States, where he was the Herbert C. Brown Distinguished Professor and the director of the Negishi-Brown Institute. He was awarded the 2010 Nobel Prize in Chemistry "for palladium catalyzed cross couplings in organic synthesis" jointly with Richard F. Heck and Akira Suzuki.

== Early life and education ==
Negishi was born in Xinjing (today known as Changchun), the capital of Manchukuo, in July 1935. Following the transfer of his father who worked at the South Manchuria Railway in 1936, he moved to Harbin, and lived eight years there. In 1943, when he was nine, the Negishi family moved to Incheon, and a year later to Kyongsong Prefecture (now Seoul), both in Japanese-occupied Korea. In November 1945, three months after World War II ended, they moved to Japan. Since he excelled as a student, a year ahead of what would have been his graduation from grammar school, he was admitted to an elite secondary school, Shonan High School. At the age of 17, he gained admission to the University of Tokyo. After graduation from the University of Tokyo in 1958, Negishi did his internship at Teijin, where he conducted research on polymer chemistry. Later, he continued his studies in the United States after having won a Fulbright Scholarship and obtained his Ph.D. from the University of Pennsylvania in 1963, under the supervision of professor Allan R. Day.

== Career ==
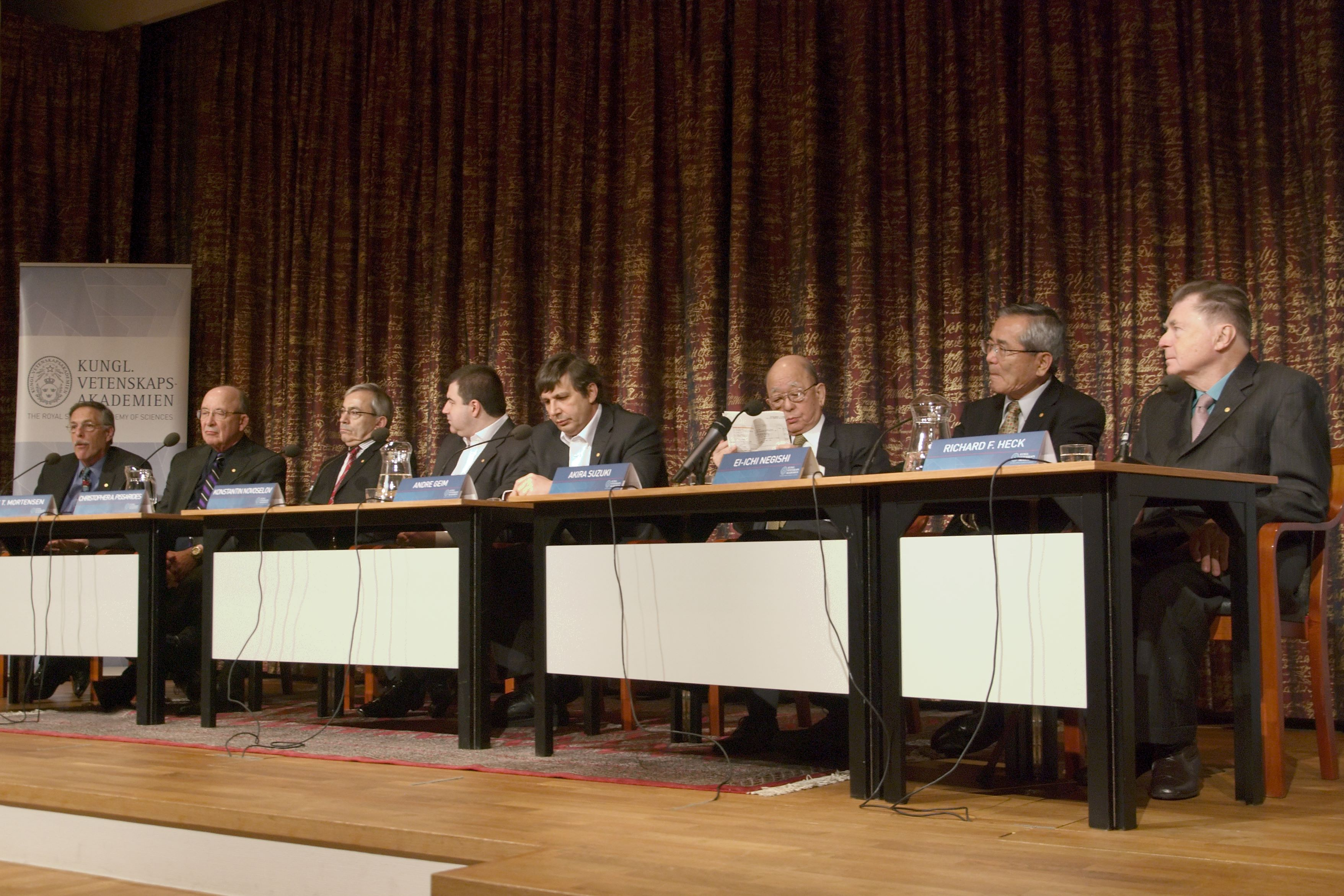
Peter Diamond, Dale T. Mortensen, Christopher A. Pissarides, Konstantin Novoselov, Andre Geim, Akira Suzuki, Ei-ichi Negishi, and Richard Heck, Nobel Prize Laureates 2010, at a press conference at the Royal Swedish Academy of Sciences in Stockholm

After obtaining his Ph.D., Negishi decided to become an academic researcher. Although he was hoping to work at a Japanese university, he could not find a position. In 1966 he resigned from Teijin, and became a postdoctoral associate at Purdue University, working under future Nobel laureate Herbert C. Brown. From 1968 to 1972 he was an instructor at Purdue.

In 1972, he became an assistant professor at Syracuse University, where began his lifelong study of transition metal–catalyzed reactions, and was promoted to associate professor in 1979. He returned to Purdue University as a full professor in the same year.

He discovered Negishi coupling, a process which condenses organic zinc compounds and organic halides under a palladium or nickel catalyst to obtain a C–C bonded product. For this achievement, he was awarded the Nobel Prize in Chemistry in 2010. Negishi also reported that organoaluminum compounds and organic zirconium compounds can be used for cross-coupling. He did not seek a patent for this coupling technology and explained his reasoning as follows: "If we did not obtain a patent, we thought that everyone could use our results easily." In addition, Zr(C_{5}H_{5})_{2} obtained by reducing zirconocene dichloride is also called Negishi reagent, which can be used in oxidative cyclisation reactions. The technique he developed is estimated to be used in a quarter of all reactions in the pharmaceutical industry.

By the time Negishi retired in 2019, he had published more than 400 academic papers. He was committed to instilling rigorous practices in his lab, emphasizing the need of keeping organized and comprehensive records. Before any separations, he asked his student to evaluate crude reaction mixtures in order to minimize loss of any useful scientific information.

== Recognition ==
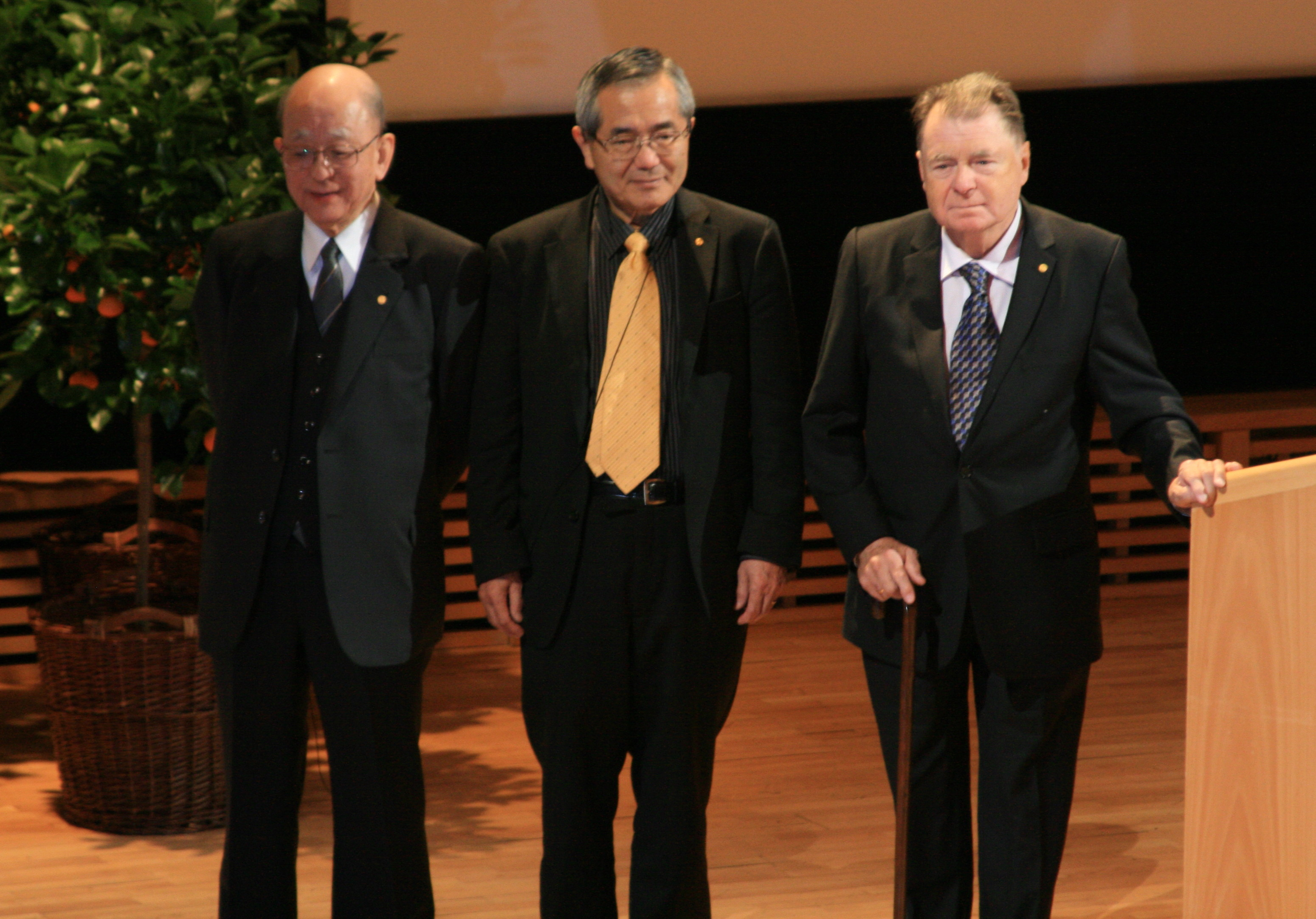
From left: Suzuki, Negishi, and Heck (2010)

On November 12, 2010, University of Chicago professor Yoichiro Nambu, recipient of the 2008 Nobel Prize in Physics, made a special appearance at a celebration held in honor of Ei-ichi Negishi. Both men were Japanese Nobel laureates residing in the American Midwest and alumni of the University of Tokyo.

=== Awards ===
- 1996 – A. R. Day Award (ACS Philadelphia Section award)
- 1997 – Chemical Society of Japan Award
- 1998 – Herbert N. McCoy Award
- 1998 – American Chemical Society Award for Organometallic Chemistry
- 1998–2000 – Alexander von Humboldt Senior Researcher Award
- 2003 – Sigma Xi Award, Purdue University
- 2007 – Yamada–Koga Prize
- 2007 – Gold Medal of Charles University, Prague, Czech Republic
- 2010 – Nobel Prize in Chemistry
- 2010 – ACS Award for Creative Work in Synthetic Organic Chemistry
- 2015 – Fray International Sustainability Award, SIPS 2015

=== Honors ===
- 1960–61 – Fulbright–Smith–Mundt Fellowship
- 1962–63 – Harrison Fellowship at University of Pennsylvania
- 1986 – Guggenheim Fellowship
- 2000 – Sir Edward Frankland Prize Lectureship
- 2009 – Invited Lectureship, 4th Mitsui International Catalysis Symposium (MICS-4), Kisarazu, Japan
- 2010 – Order of Culture and Person of Cultural Merit
- 2011 – Sagamore of the Wabash
- 2011 – Order of the Griffin, Purdue University
- 2011 – Fellow, American Academy of Arts & Sciences
- 2011 – Honorary doctor of science, University of Pennsylvania.
- 2012 – Honorary Fellow of Royal Society of Chemistry (RSC)
- 2014 – Foreign Associate of the National Academy of Sciences

== Personal life and death ==
Negishi began dating Sumire Suzuki in his freshman year and they announced their engagement to their parents in March 1958. They had met at a choir of which they were both members at in university. They married the next year and together they had two daughters.

Negishi loved playing the piano and conducting. During the "Pacifichem" 2015 conference's closing ceremony, he conducted an orchestra.

=== Disappearance ===
On the evening of March 12, 2018, both Negishi and his wife were reported missing by family members. Police determined that, based on a purchase made earlier in the day, the couple had left their home in West Lafayette, Indiana, and headed north. At about 5 a.m. the next day, officers in Ogle County, Illinois, received a call to check on the welfare of an elderly man who was walking on a rural road south of Rockford. When he was taken to hospital, officers identified him as Negishi and found that police in Indiana were looking for him and his wife. A short time later, Suzuki's body was found at the Orchard Hills Landfill in Davis Junction, along with the couple's car.

According to a statement from the family, the couple was driving to Rockford International Airport for a trip when their car became stuck in a ditch on a road near the landfill. Negishi went looking for help and was said to be suffering from an "acute state of confusion and shock". The Ogle County Sheriff Department said there was no suspicion of foul play in Suzuki's death, although the cause of her death was not immediately released. The family said Suzuki was near the end of her battle with Parkinson's disease.

In May 2018, an autopsy concluded that Suzuki died from hypothermia, but Parkinson's disease and hypertension were contributing factors.

=== Death ===
Negishi died in Indianapolis, Indiana, on June 6, 2021. He was 85 years old. No funeral services took place in the United States, but his family planned to lay him to rest in Japan in 2022.

== See also ==
- List of Japanese Nobel laureates
- Richard F. Heck
- Makoto Kumada
- Akira Suzuki
- Kenkichi Sonogashira
