= C7H10 =

The molecular formula C_{7}H_{10} may refer to:

- Cycloheptadienes
  - 1,3-Cycloheptadiene
  - 1,4-Cycloheptadiene
- Cycloheptyne
- Norbornene
- [2.2.1]Propellane
- [3.1.1]Propellane
