= Cyclononyne =

Names
- Preferred IUPAC name Cyclononyne

Identifiers
| CAS Number | 6573-52-0 |
| 3D model (JSmol) | Interactive image |
| Beilstein Reference | 1920441 |
| ChEBI | CHEBI:37816 |
| ChemSpider | 122379 |
| PubChem CID | 138773 |
| CompTox Dashboard (EPA) | DTXSID60215936 |
- InChI: InChI=1S/C9H14/c1-2-4-6-8-9-7-5-3-1/h1-7H2 Key: WXUICIMSUQBFMI-UHFFFAOYSA-N
- SMILES: C1CCCC#CCCC1

Properties
| Chemical formula | C_{9}H_{14} |
| Molar mass | 122.211 g·mol^{−1} |
| Density | 0.8972 g/cm³ |
| Boiling point | 68 °C (154 °F; 341 K) at 15 Torr |

Related compounds
| Related compounds | Cyclopentyne; Cyclooctyne; Cyclononene; Cyclononane; Cyclodecyne |
- Except where otherwise noted, data are given for materials in their standard state (at 25 °C [77 °F], 100 kPa). Infobox references

Cyclononyne is an organic compound with the chemical formula C_{9}H_{14}. Its molecule has a ring of nine carbon atoms, connected by eight single bonds and one triple bond.

== Synthesis ==
The compound can be prepared by converting 1,2-cyclononanedione to the corresponding dihydrazone via hydrazine and then reacting it with mercuric oxide in the presence of sodium sulfate. When 1,2-cyclononadiene is exposed to light in a dilute pentane solution, it will produce a small amount of cyclononyne and other C_{9} cycloolefin products via the intermediate isomer of bicyclo[6.1.0]non-8-ene.

== Properties ==
It is reported that pyrolysis of cyclononyne at 600 °C will lead to forming 1,2,8-nonatriene and trans-bicyclo[4.3.0]nona-2-ene in a 1:0.9 ratio.

Under the catalysis of a rhodium complex, it is refluxed with sulfur in butanone to obtain a 1,4-dithiine derivative (which then by refluxing in o-dichlorobenzene can be desulfurized to obtain a thiophene derivative).
