= C5H6 =

The molecular formula C_{5}H_{6} (molar mass: 66.10 g/mol, exact mass: 66.04695 u) may refer to:

- Cyclopentadiene
- Cyclopropylacetylene
- [1.1.1]propellane
- Cyclopentyne
