= Cycloheptyne =

Names
- Preferred IUPAC name Cycloheptyne

Identifiers
| CAS Number | 6577-09-9 |
| 3D model (JSmol) | Interactive image |
| ChemSpider | 9063096 |
| PubChem CID | 10887832 |
- InChI: InChI=1S/C7H10/c1-2-4-6-7-5-3-1/h1-5H2 Key: WAXSUAIGRGARIT-UHFFFAOYSA-N
- SMILES: C1CCC#CCC1

Properties
| Chemical formula | C_{7}H_{10} |
| Molar mass | 94.157 g·mol^{−1} |
| Density | 0.9 g/cm³ |

Related compounds
| Related compounds | Cyclobutyne; Cyclopentyne; Cyclooctyne; Cycloheptene; Cycloheptane |
- Except where otherwise noted, data are given for materials in their standard state (at 25 °C [77 °F], 100 kPa). Infobox references

Cycloheptyne is an organic compound from the group of cycloalkynes with the chemical formula C_{7}H_{10}. It is a cyclic molecule containing a carbon-carbon triple bond within a seven-membered ring. This ring structure makes the molecule strained.

== Synthesis ==
Cycloheptyne can be prepared starting from N,N'-diisopropylcycloheptane-1,2-diimine. By reaction with ammonia and hydroxylamine-O-sulfonic acid in methanol and subsequent reaction with silver(I) oxide; this is converted into a dispiro compound with two diazirine rings. Heating or irradiation of this compound leads to the elimination of two molecules of nitrogen to form cycloheptyne.

An alternative synthesis method starts from cycloheptanone. This is first reacted with lithium diisopropylamide and para-tolyl-para-toluenethiosulfonate to introduce a sulfide unit. An enol triflate is then formed using potassium hexamethyldisilazide and bis(trifluoromethanesulfonyl)aniline, and the sulfide group is oxidized to the sulfoxide with meta-chloroperbenzoic acid.
