= Cyclohexyne =

Names
- Preferred IUPAC name Cyclohexyne

Identifiers
CAS Number	1589-69-1
3D model (JSmol)	Interactive image
ChemSpider	9254522
PubChem CID	11079373
CompTox Dashboard (EPA)	DTXSID50454473
- InChI: InChI=1S/C6H8/c1-2-4-6-5-3-1/h1-4H2 Key: AAFFTDXPYADISO-UHFFFAOYSA-N
- SMILES: C1CCC#CC1

Properties
Chemical formula	C_{6}H_{8}
Molar mass	80.130 g·mol^{−1}

Related compounds
Related compounds	Cyclobutyne; Cyclopentyne; Cyclooctyne; Cyclohexene; Cyclohexane; Cyclo(18)carbon
- Except where otherwise noted, data are given for materials in their standard state (at 25 °C [77 °F], 100 kPa). Infobox references

Cyclohexyne is an organic compound with the formula C_{2}(CH_{2})_{4}. It strained cyclic alkyne. Due to its high ring strain, cyclohexyne cannot be isolated but exists only as a short-lived reactive intermediate.

== Synthesis ==
Cyclohexyne can be generated by the elimination of hydrogen halides from suitable precursors. Other methods include the use of organolithium reagents or photolytic or thermal activation of precursor molecules.

== Cyclohexyne as a ligand ==
A platinum complex of cyclohexyne can be prepared by elimination from 1-bromocyclohexene with lithium diisopropylamide in the presence of tris(triphenylphosphine)platinum(0). An alternative synthetic method is the reduction of 1,2-dibromocyclohexene with sodium amalgam in the presence of tris(triphenylphosphine)platinum(0). Such a complex can also be prepared by trapping with tris(triphenylphosphine)platinum(0) when cyclohexenylphenyliodonium tetrafluoroborate is used as the starting material for cyclohexyne.

Another complex, in this case with zirconium, can be prepared by treating methylzirconocene chloride cyclohexenyllithium followed by trimethylphosphine.
