= C6H8 =

The molecular formula C_{6}H_{8} may refer to:

- Cyclohexadiene (disambiguation)
  - 1,3-Cyclohexadiene
  - 1,4-Cyclohexadiene
- Cyclohexyne
- Methylcyclopentadiene
- 1,3,5-Hexatriene
- The standard composition of gasoline (a mixture of different hydrocarbons) is approximately equivalent to C_{6}H_{8}
