= Tetrakis(3,5-bis(trifluoromethyl)phenyl)borate =

Chemical compound

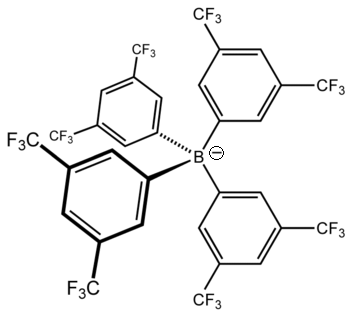
The [BAr^{F}_{4}]^{−} anion with four fluorinated aryl (Ar^{F}) groups distributed tetrahedrally about a central boron atom.

Tetrakis[3,5-bis(trifluoromethyl)phenyl]borate is an anion with chemical formula [(3,5-(CF_{3})_{2}C_{6}H_{3})_{4}B]^{−}, which is commonly abbreviated as [BAr^{F}_{4}]^{−}, indicating the presence of fluorinated aryl (Ar^{F} = 3,5-bis(trifluoromethyl)phenyl) groups. It is sometimes referred to as Kobayashi's anion in honour of Hiroshi Kobayashi who led the team that first synthesised it. More commonly it is affectionately nicknamed "BARF". The BARF ion is also abbreviated [BArF_{24}]^{−}, to distinguish it from the closely related [BArF_{20}]^{−} ([(C_{6}F_{5})_{4}B]^{−}. However, for a small group of chemists, the anion is abbreviated as TFPB, short for tetrakis[3,5-bis(trifluoromethyl)phenyl]borate.

BARF has a tetrahedral geometry around the central boron atom but each of the four surrounding aryl groups is aromatic and planar. The motivation for its preparation was the search for an anion that coordinates more weakly than the then-available ions hexafluorophosphate (PF^{−}_{6}), tetrafluoroborate (BF^{−}_{4}), or perchlorate (ClO^{−}_{4}). Salts of this anion are known as solids and in both aqueous and non-aqueous solutions. BARF can be used in catalytic systems where the active site requires an anion which will not coordinate to the metal centre and interfere with the catalytic cycle, such as in the preparation of polyketones.

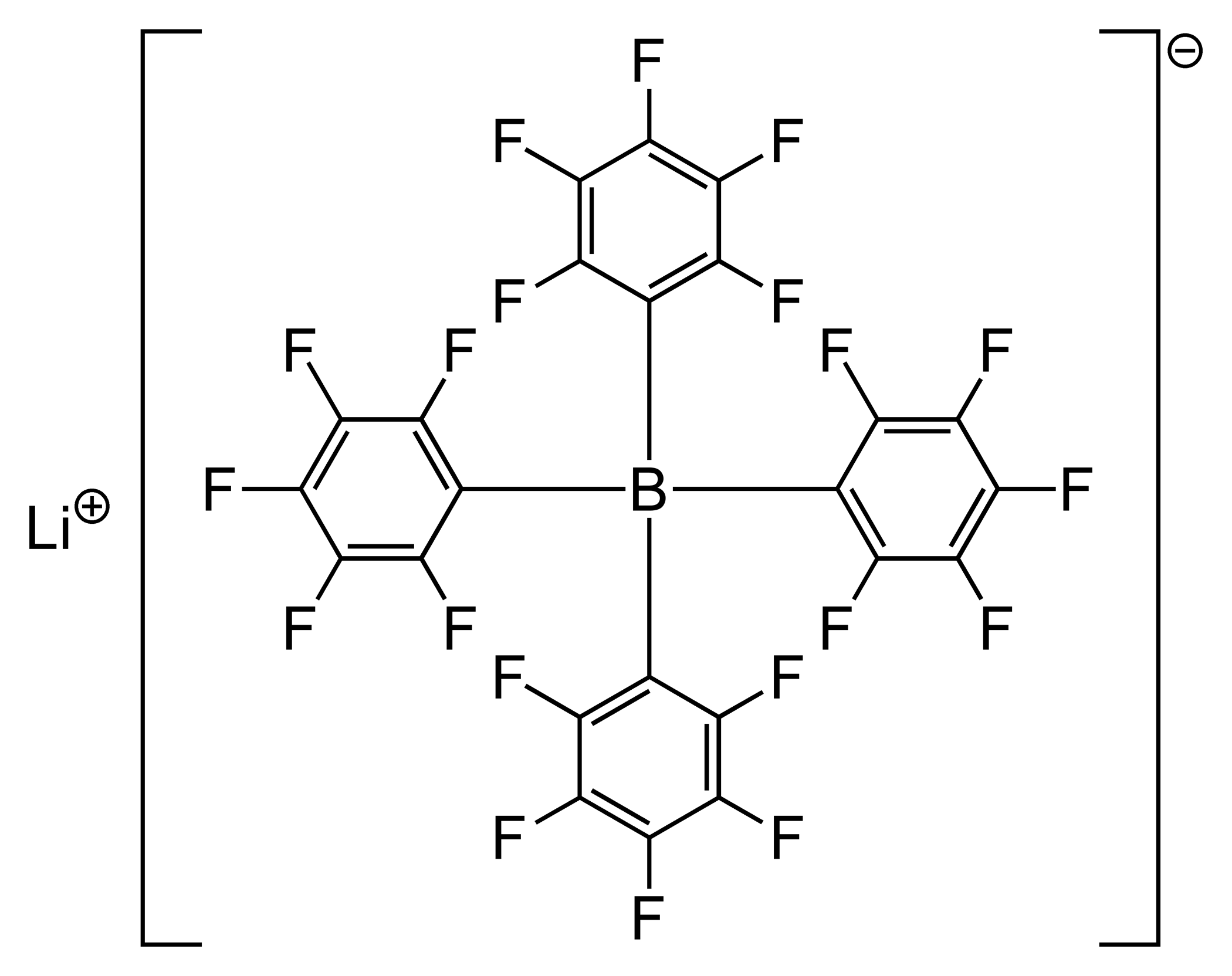
Lithium tetrakis(pentafluorophenyl)borate, Li[BArF_{20}], containing the BARF-20 anion, is used similarly to the BARF-24 anion.

== Synthesis of BARF compounds ==
The sodium salt is the starting point for most BARF derivatives. It is prepared by treating Grignard reagents derived from 3,5-(CF_{3})_{2}-C_{6}H_{3}-X (X = Br, I) with NaBF_{4}. A popular method is summarized in the following equation:

NaBF_{4} + 4 Ar^{F}MgBr → 4 MgBrF + Na[BAr^{F}_{4}]

Additional procedures emphasizing purification and control of residual water content for Na[BAr^{F}_{4}] have been reported, and a modified workup that includes an additional recrystallisation step has been described to afford solvent-free, anhydrous Li, Na and K salts of BARF at multigram scale. Brookhart's acid is the salt of the BARF anion with the diethyl ether oxonium cation, [(Et_{2}O)_{2}H][BAr^{F}_{4}]. It can be formed from the sodium salt in diethyl ether in the presence of hydrogen chloride as sodium chloride is insoluble in diethyl ether, facilitating cation exchange.

NaBAr^{F}_{4} + HCl + 2 Et_{2}O → [(Et_{2}O)_{2}H][BAr^{F}_{4}] + NaCl

Li and K salts of BARF have also been prepared by deprotonation of [(Et_{2}O)_{2}H][BAr^{F}_{4}] using alkali-metal bis(trimethylsilyl)amides.

BARF salts with hexakis(acetonitrile)metal(II) cations, [M(CH_{3}CN)_{6}]^{2+}, are known for vanadium, chromium, manganese, iron, cobalt, and nickel. They are produced by salt metathesis reactions.

== Properties ==
Non-coordinating anions are anions that interact only weakly with cations, a useful property when studying highly electrophilic cations. In coordination chemistry, the term can also be used to refer to anions which are unlikely to bind directly to the metal center of a complex. Hexafluorophosphate is a non-coordinating anion in both senses of the term. Three widely used non-coordinating anions are hexafluorophosphate, tetrafluoroborate (BF^{−}_{4}), and perchlorate (ClO^{−}_{4}); of these, the hexafluorophosphate (PF^{−}_{6}) ion has the least coordinating ability and it is deliberately used for this property. BARF was developed as a new non-coordinating anion in the 1990s, and is far less coordinating than even the hexafluorophosphate anion. Extremely Lewis acidic metal centers can, however, cleave the carbon-boron bond in BARF.

Na[BAr^{F}_{4}] can be used in deprotection of acetal or ketal-protected carbonyl compounds. For example, deprotection of 2-phenyl-1,3-dioxolane to benzaldehyde can be achieved in water in five minutes at 30 °C (86 °F).

PhCH(OCH_{2})_{2} + H_{2}O $\ce{->[\ce{Na[BAr4]}][\text{30 °C / 5 min}]}$PhCHO + HOCH_{2}CH_{2}OH
