= C4H4 =

C_{4}H_{4} isomers with CAS registry numbers

The molecular formula C_{4}H_{4} (molar mass: 52.07 g/mol) may refer to:

- Butatriene
- Cyclobutadiene
- Cyclobutyne
- Methylenecyclopropene
- Tetrahedrane
- Vinylacetylene
