= Cyclodecyne =

Names
- Preferred IUPAC name Cyclodecyne
- Other names 1-Cyclodecyne

Identifiers
CAS Number	3022-41-1
3D model (JSmol)	Interactive image
Beilstein Reference	2203338
ChEBI	CHEBI:37817
ChemSpider	121452
PubChem CID	137799
CompTox Dashboard (EPA)	DTXSID70184321
- InChI: InChI=1S/C10H16/c1-2-4-6-8-10-9-7-5-3-1/h1-8H2 Key: BGMJEAAFHCTKBY-UHFFFAOYSA-N
- SMILES: C1CCCCC#CCCC1

Properties
Chemical formula	C_{10}H_{16}
Molar mass	136.238 g·mol^{−1}
Density	0.898 g/cm³
Boiling point	205 °C (401 °F; 478 K)

Related compounds
Related compounds	Cyclopentyne; Cyclooctyne; Cyclononene; Cyclononane
- Except where otherwise noted, data are given for materials in their standard state (at 25 °C [77 °F], 100 kPa). Infobox references

Cyclodecyne is an organic compound with the chemical formula C_{10}H_{16}. The molecule has a ring of 10 carbon atoms, connected by nine single bonds and one triple bond.

== Synthesis ==
Cyclodecyne was first synthesized and isolated in the mid-20th century as part of studies on medium-ring hydrocarbons. A common synthetic route involves the double dehydrohalogenation of 1,2-dibromocyclodecane using a strong base such as potassium hydroxide (KOH) or sodium amide (NaNH_{2}) in a high-boiling solvent:

1,2-dibromocyclodecane + 2KOH → cyclodecyne + 2KBr + 2H_{2}O

Alternatively, Fritsch–Buttenberg–Wiechell rearrangement of suitable dibromovinyl precursors has been used to generate cyclodecyne under milder conditions.

== Physical properties ==
Due to its reactivity, cyclodecyne is often generated in situ and trapped in cycloaddition reactions rather than stored for long periods.
