= C3H2 =

The molecular formula C_{3}H_{2} (molar mass: 38.05 g/mol, exact mass: 38.0157 u) may refer to:

- Cyclopropenylidene, an aromatic carbene
- Cyclopropyne, the cyclic analog of an alkyne
