= Cycloheptadiene =

Cycloheptadiene may refer to:

- 1,2-Cycloheptadiene, CAS 6577-10-2
- 1,3-Cycloheptadiene
- 1,4-Cycloheptadiene

== See also ==
- Cycloheptatriene or its theoretical isomer 1,3,5-Cycloheptatriene
- Cycloheptene
