= Brookhart's acid =

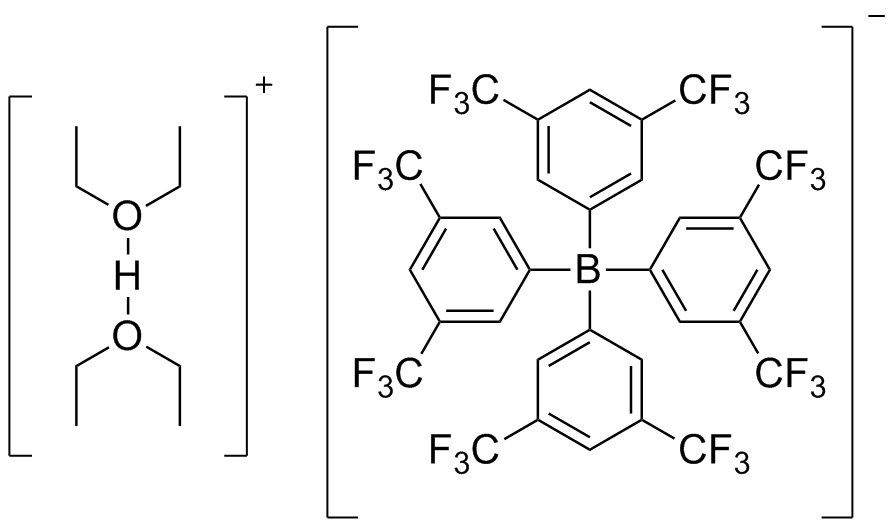

Identifiers
CAS Number	139362-04-2
3D model (JSmol)	Interactive image
ChemSpider	9301081
PubChem CID	11125959
- InChI: InChI=1S/C32H12BF24.2C4H10O/c34-25(35,36)13-1-14(26(37,38)39)6-21(5-13)33(22-7-15(27(40,41)42)2-16(8-22)28(43,44)45,23-9-17(29(46,47)48)3-18(10-23)30(49,50)51)24-11-19(31(52,53)54)4-20(12-24)32(55,56)57;2*1-3-5-4-2/h1-12H;2*3-4H2,1-2H3/q-1;;/p+1 Key: WIRVRHHKOXMSND-UHFFFAOYSA-O; InChI=1/C32H12BF24.2C4H10O/c34-25(35,36)13-1-14(26(37,38)39)6-21(5-13)33(22-7-15(27(40,41)42)2-16(8-22)28(43,44)45,23-9-17(29(46,47)48)3-18(10-23)30(49,50)51)24-11-19(31(52,53)54)4-20(12-24)32(55,56)57;2*1-3-5-4-2/h1-12H;2*3-4H2,1-2H3/q-1;;/p+1 Key: WIRVRHHKOXMSND-IKLDFBCSAB
- SMILES: FC(F)(F)c1cc(cc(c1)C(F)(F)F)[B-](c2cc(cc(c2)C(F)(F)F)C(F)(F)F)(c3cc(cc(c3)C(F)(F)F)C(F)(F)F)c4cc(cc(c4)C(F)(F)F)C(F)(F)F.O(CC)CC.[OH+](CC)CC

Properties
Chemical formula	C_{40}H_{33}BF_{24}O_{2}
Molar mass	1012.46
Appearance	White crystalline solid

Hazards
- Occupational safety and health (OHS/OSH)
Main hazards	Strong acid
- Except where otherwise noted, data are given for materials in their standard state (at 25 °C [77 °F], 100 kPa). Infobox references

Brookhart's acid is the salt of the diethyl ether oxonium ion and tetrakis[3,5-bis(trifluoromethyl)phenyl]borate (BAr′_{4}). It is a colorless solid, used as a strong acid. The compound was first reported by Volpe, Grant, and Brookhart in 1992.

== Preparation ==
This compound is prepared by treatment of a diethyl ether (Et_{2}O) solution of NaBAr^{F}_{4} (BAr^{F}_{4}^{-} = B(C_{6}H_{3}(CF_{3})_{2})_{4}^{-}) with hydrogen chloride:

NaBAr^{F}_{4} + HCl + 2 Et_{2}O → [H(OEt_{2})_{2}]^{+}[BAr^{F}_{4}]^{-} + NaCl

[H(OEt_{2})_{2}][BAr^{F}_{4}] is soluble in diethyl ether, whereas sodium chloride is not. Precipitation of sodium chloride thus drives the formation of the oxonium acid compound, which is isolable as a solid.

== Structure and properties ==
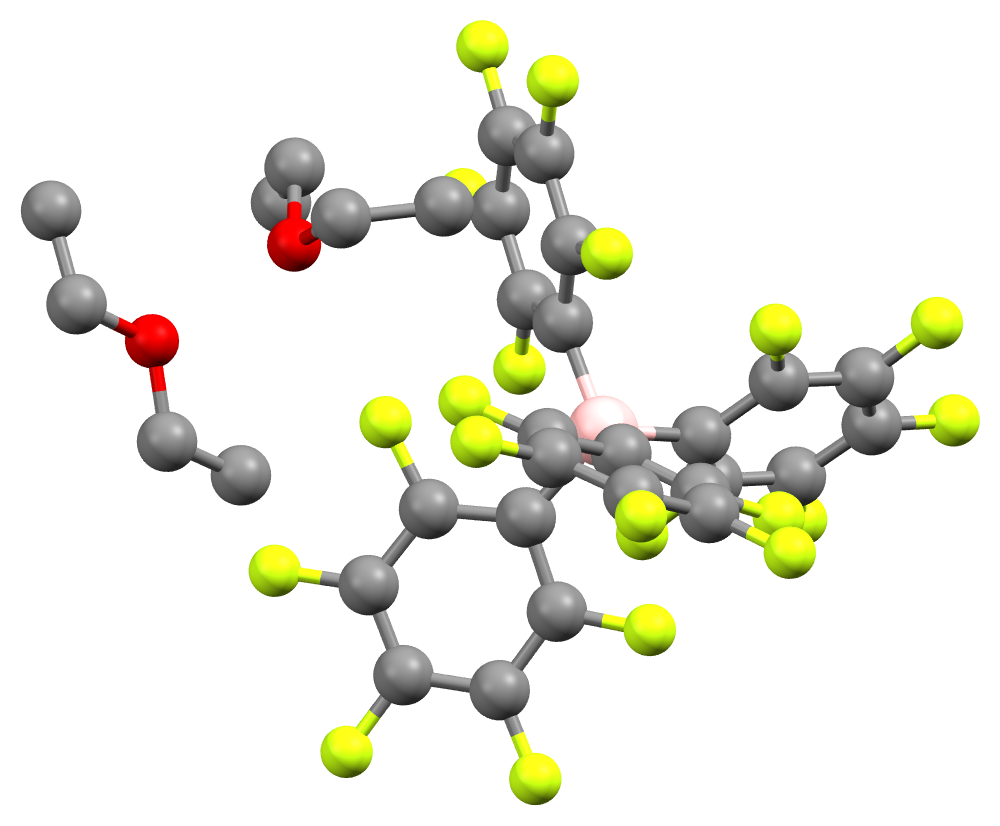
The crystal structure of the compound [H(OEt_{2})_{2}][B(C_{6}F_{5})_{4}], that is closely related to Brookhart's acid. The acidic proton, which resides between the ether oxygen centres, is not shown.

The acid crystallizes as a white, hygroscopic crystalline solid. NMR and elemental analysis showed that the crystal contains two equivalents of diethyl ether. In solution, the compound slowly degrades to m-C_{6}H_{3}(CF_{3})_{2} and BAr′_{3}.

[H(OEt_{2})_{2}][B(C_{6}F_{5})_{4}] is a related compound with a slightly different weakly coordinating anion; it was first reported in 2000. An X-ray crystal structure of that compound was obtained, showing the acidic proton coordinated by both ethereal oxygen centers, although the crystal was not good enough to determine whether the proton is located symmetrically or unsymmetrically between the two.

== Uses ==
Traditional weakly coordinating anions, such as perchlorate, tetrafluoroborate, and hexafluorophosphate, will nonetheless coordinate to very electrophilic cations, making these counterions unsuitable for some complexes. The highly reactive species [Cp_{2}Zr(CH_{3})]^{+}, for example, has been reported to abstract F^{−} from PF_{6}. Starting in the 1980s, new types of weakly coordinating anions began to be developed. BAr′_{4} anions are used as counterions for highly electrophilic, cationic transition metal species, as they are very weakly coordinating and unreactive towards electrophilic attack. One common method of generating these cationic species is via protonolysis of a dialkyl complexes or an olefin complex. For example, an electrophilic palladium catalyst, [(2,2′-bipyridine)Pd(CH_{3})(CH_{3}CN)][BAr′_{4}], is prepared by protonating the dimethyl complex with Brookhart's acid. This electrophilic, cationic palladium species is used for the polymerization of olefins with carbon monoxide to polyketones in aprotic solvents.

=== Potential application ===
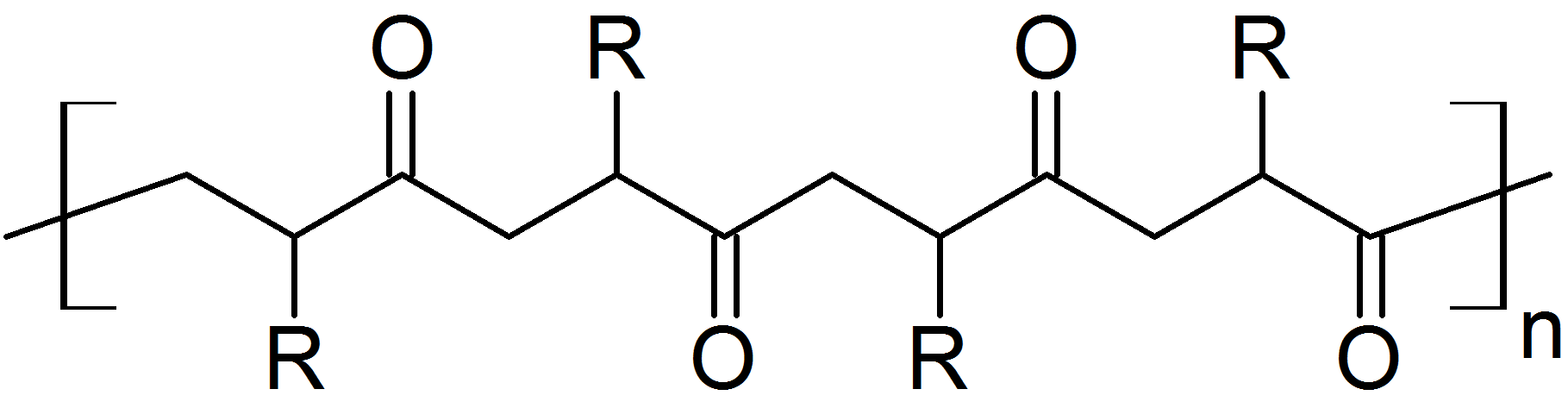
General chemical structure of a polyketone

Polyketones, thermoplastic polymers, are formed by the copolymerisation of carbon monoxide and one or more alkenes (typically ethylene with propylene). The process utilises a palladium(II) catalyst with a bidentate ligand like 2,2′-bipyridine or 1,10-phenanthroline (phen) with a non-coordinating BARF counterion, such as [(phen)Pd(CH_{3})(CO)]BAr^{F}_{4}. The preparation of the catalyst involves the reaction of a dimethyl palladium complex with Brookhart's acid in acetonitrile with loss of methane and the catalytic species is formed by uptake of carbon monoxide to displace acetonitrile.

[(Et_{2}O)_{2}H]BAr^{F}_{4} + [(phen)Pd(CH_{3})_{2}] + MeCN → [(phen)Pd(CH_{3})(MeCN)]BAr^{F}_{4} + 2 Et_{2}O + CH_{4}

[(phen)Pd(CH_{3})(MeCN)]BAr^{F}_{4} + CO → [(phen)Pd(CH_{3})(CO)]BAr^{F}_{4} + MeCN

The mechanism involves migratory insertion whereby the polymer chain is bound to the catalytic centre and grows by the sequential insertion of carbon monoxide and the alkene between the palladium atom and the existing chain. Defects occur when insertions do not alternate – that is, a carbon monoxide insertion follows a carbon monoxide insertion or an alkene insertion follows an alkene insertion – these are highlighted in red in the figure below. This catalyst produces a very low rate of defects due to the difference in Gibbs energy of activation of each insertion – the energy barrier to inserting an alkene immediately following an alkene insertion is ~12 kJ mol^{−1} higher than barrier to carbon monoxide insertion. Use of monodentate phosphine ligands also leads to undesirable side-products but bidentate phosphine ligands like 1,3-bis(diphenylphosphino)propane have been used industrially.

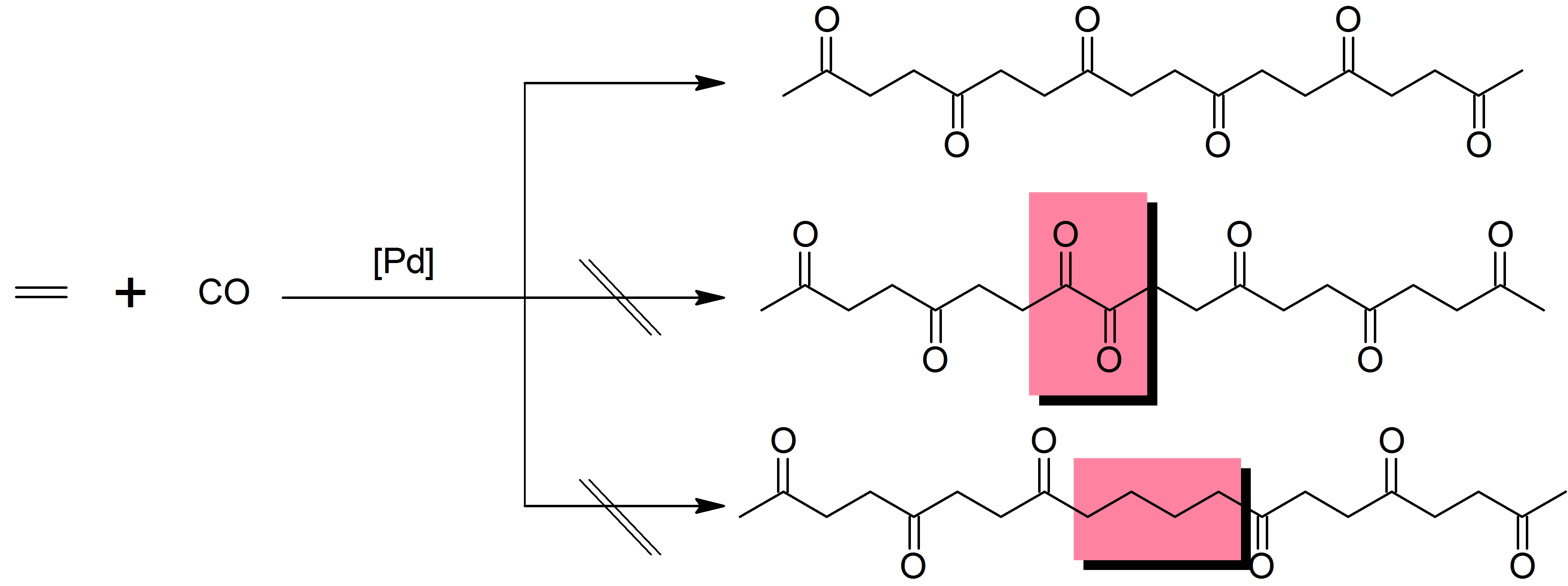
Copolymerisation of ethylene and carbon monoxide to a polyketone. Examples of defects from double insertions are highlighted in red.
