= Post-metallocene catalyst =

Catalyst for the industrial production of plastics

A post-metallocene catalyst is a kind of catalyst for the polymerization of olefins, i.e., the industrial production of some of the most common plastics. "Post-metallocene" refers to a class of homogeneous catalysts that are not metallocenes. This area has attracted much attention because the market for polyethylene, polypropylene, and related copolymers is large. There is a corresponding intense market for new processes as indicated by the fact that, in the US alone, 50,000 patents were issued between 1991-2007 on polyethylene and polypropylene.

Many methods exist to polymerize alkenes, including the traditional routes using Philips catalyst and traditional heterogeneous Ziegler-Natta catalysts, which still are used to produce the bulk of polyethylene.

== Catalysts based on early transition metals ==
Early metal post-metallocene catalyst designs

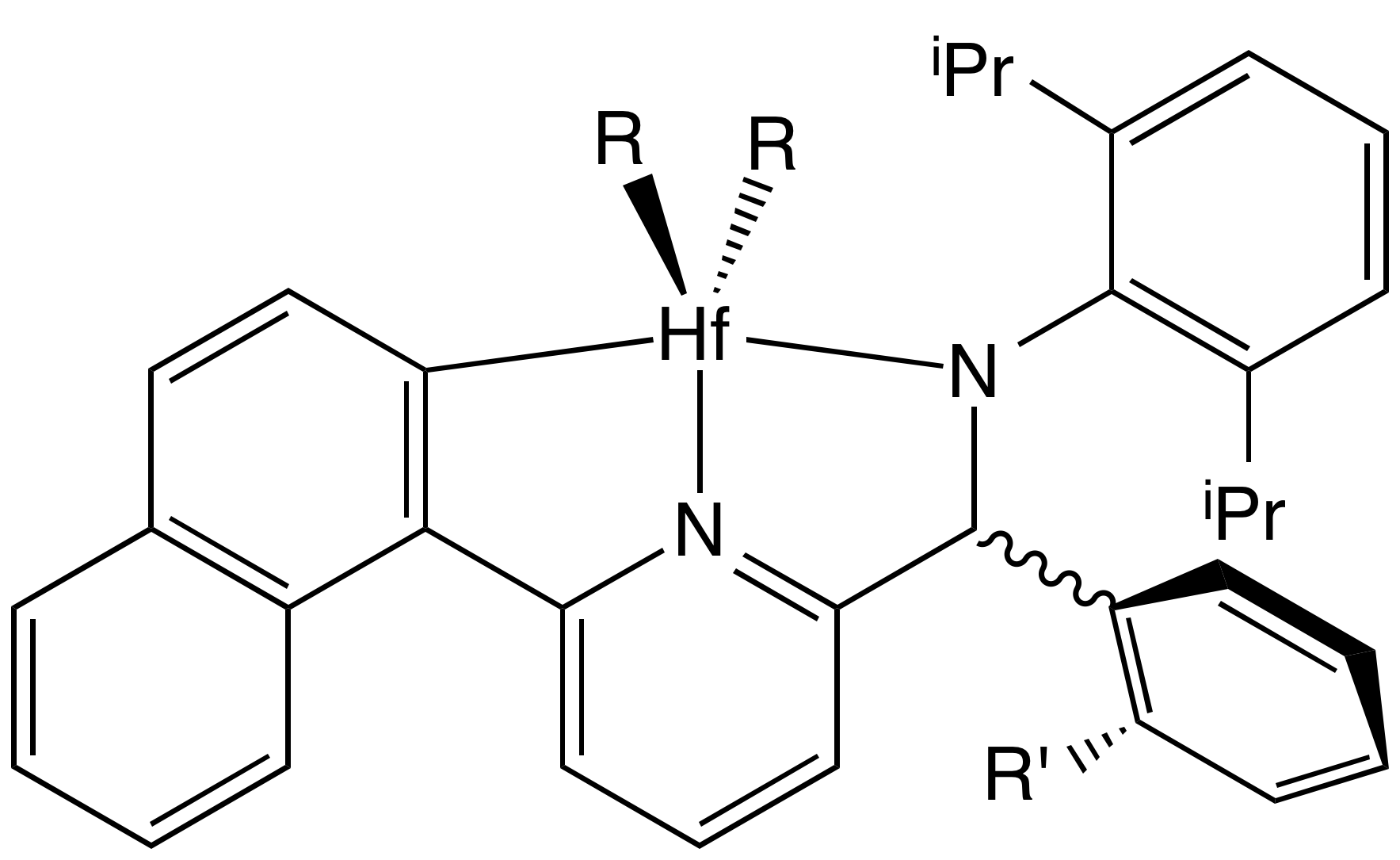
Generic structure of a post-metallocene catalyst based on Dow's pyridyl-amido design.

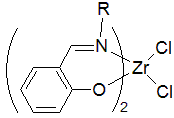
Early examples of postmetallocene catalysts included Schiff base ligands.

Homogeneous metallocene catalysts, e.g., derived from or related to zirconocene dichloride introduced a level of microstructural control that was unavailable with heterogeneous systems. Metallocene catalysts are homogeneous single-site systems, implying that a uniform catalyst is present in the solution. In contrast, commercially important Ziegler-Natta heterogeneous catalysts contain a distribution of catalytic sites. The catalytic properties of single-site catalysts can be controlled by modification of the ligand. Initially ligand modifications focused on various cyclopentadienyl derivatives, but great diversity was uncovered through high throughput screening. These post-metallocene catalysts employ a range of chelating ligands, often including pyridine and amido (R_{2}N^{−}). These ligands are available in great diversity with respect to their steric and electronic properties. Such postmetallocene catalysts enabled the introduction of Chain shuttling polymerization.

== Catalysts based on late transition metals ==
The copolymerization of ethylene with polar monomers has been heavily studied. The high oxophilicity of the early metals precluded their use in this application.

Late metal post-metallocene catalyst designs

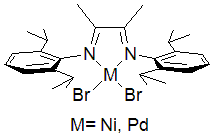
Catalyst supported by charge-neutral alpha-diimine ligands.

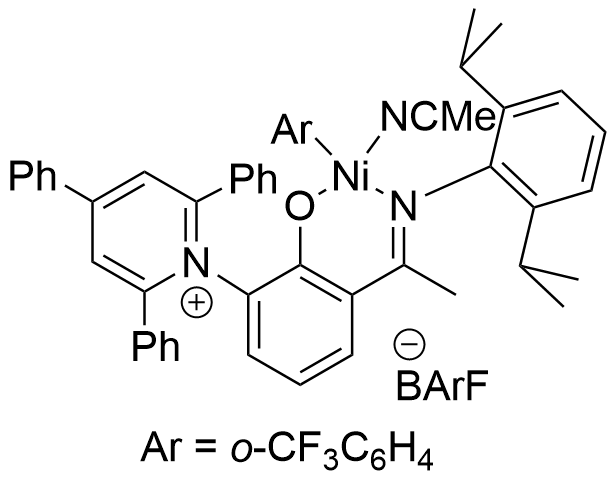
Catalyst supported by highly electron-withdrawing substituted ligand.

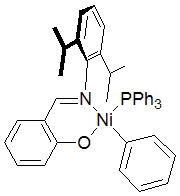
Catalyst supported by anionic Schiff base ligand

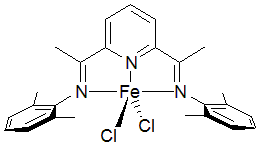
Catalysts supported by tridentate diiminopyridine ligand.

Efforts to copolymerize polar comonomers led to catalysts based upon nickel and palladium, inspired by the success of the Shell Higher Olefin Process. Typical post-metallocene catalysts feature bulky, neutral, alpha-diimine ligands. DuPont commercialized the Versipol olefin polymerization system. Eastman commercialized the related Gavilan technology. These complexes catalyze the homopolymerize ethylene to a variety of structures that range from high density polyethylene through hydrocarbon plastomers and elastomers by a mechanism referred to as “chain-walking”. By modifying the bulk of the alpha-diimine, the product distribution of these systems can be 'tuned' to consist of hydrocarbon oils (alpha-olefins), similar to those produced by more tradition nickel(II) oligo/polymerization catalysts. As opposed to metallocenes, they can also randomly copolymerize ethylene with polar comonomers such as methyl acrylate.

A second class of catalysts feature mono-anionic bidentate ligands related to salen ligands. and DuPont.

The concept of bulky bis-imine ligands was extended to iron complexes Representative catalysts feature diiminopyridine ligands. These catalysts are highly active but do not promote chain walking. The give very linear high-density polyethylene when bulky and when the steric bulk is removed, they are very active for ethylene oligomerization to linear alpha-olefins.

A salicylimine catalyst system based on zirconium exhibits high activity for ethylene polymerization. The catalysts can also produce some novel polypropylene structures. Despite intensive efforts, few catalysts have been successfully commercialized for the copolymerization of polar monomers.
