= Maurice Brookhart =

American chemist

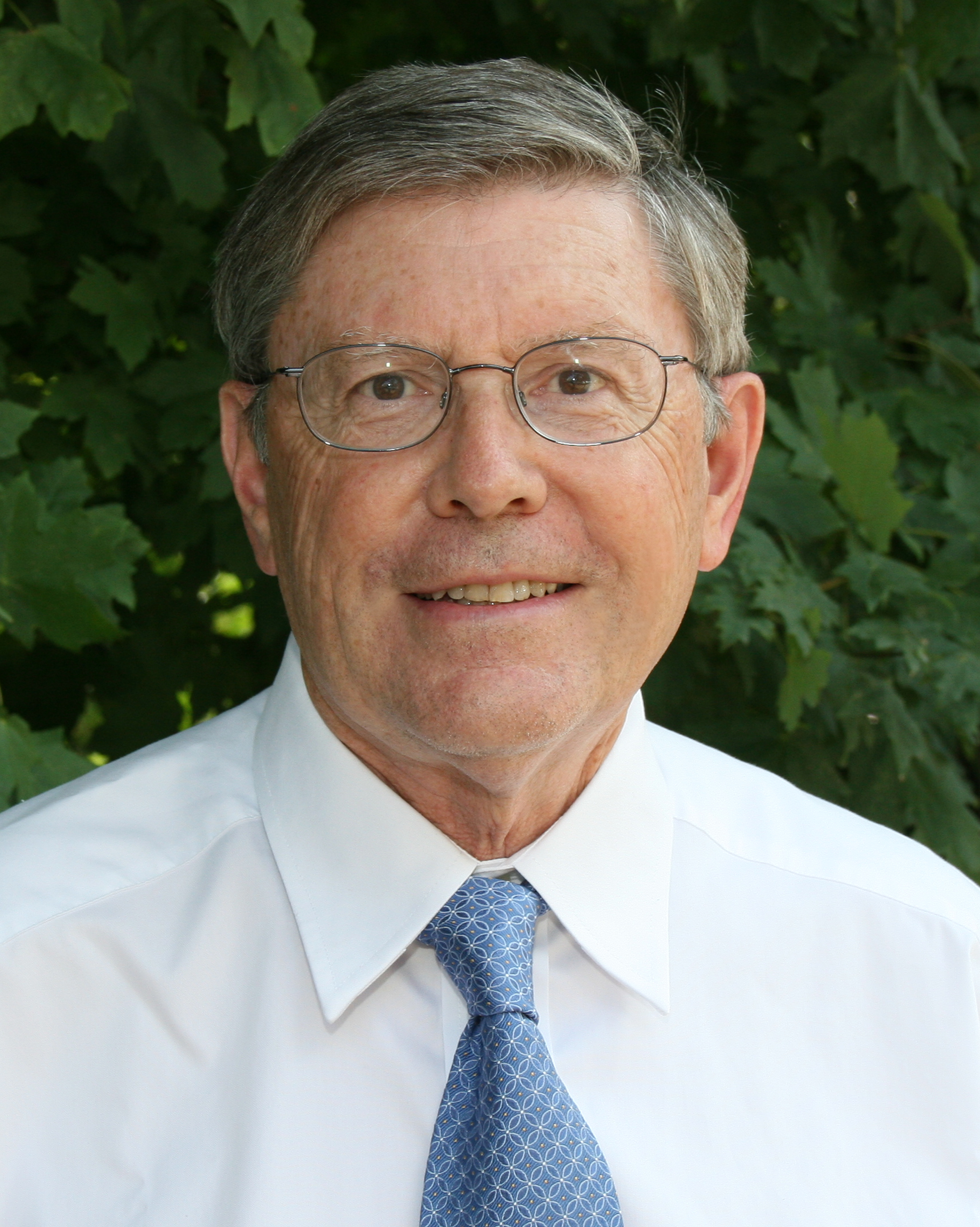
- Born: November 28, 1942; Cumberland (Maryland)
- Citizenship: United States
- Education: Johns Hopkins, UCLA
- Known for: Mechanisms in organometallic chemistry Agostic interaction Brookhart's acid Brookhart's catalysts
- Awards: Oesper Award (2016); ACS Gabor A. Somorjai Award for Catalysis Research (2015); Willard Gibbs Award (2010); North Carolina Award(2008); Centenary Prize (2000)
- Scientific career
- Fields: Organometallic chemistry
- Workplaces: University of Houston 2015–present University of North Carolina at Chapel Hill 1969–2015
- Doctoral advisor: Saul Winstein

Maurice S. Brookhart (born 1942) is an American chemist, and professor of chemistry at the University of Houston since 2015.

Brookhart received his bachelor's degree from Johns Hopkins University in 1964. He received his PhD in 1968 from the University of California, Los Angeles, in physical organic chemistry where his thesis advisor was Saul Winstein. After an NSF postdoctoral fellowship at the University of California, Los Angeles in 1968 and a NATO postdoctoral fellowship at Southampton University, England. In 1969, he joined the faculty of the University of North Carolina, where he stayed until 2015, when he joined the University of Houston as a professor of chemistry.

His research group is noted for its research in the general area of synthetic and mechanistic organometallic chemistry. A recent major thrust has been the development of post-metallocene catalysts based upon late transition metal (Ni and Pd) complexes for olefin coordination polymerization. They carry out their mechanistic investigation of the polymerization reactions primarily by low temperature IR and NMR spectroscopies. The work provides a detailed understanding of catalyst resting states and relative intermediates.

A second major focus of Brookhart's group concerns fundamental studies of C-H and C-C bond activations by transition metal complexes and the incorporation of these bond activation steps into catalytic cycles. They have successfully demonstrated catalysis of the ortho-alkylation of aromatic ketones, alkyl aldehyde isomerization, hydroacylation, and the dehydrogenation of alkoxy silanes to generate silyl enol ethers. Recent work on alkane metathesis has received attention.

He has over 300 publications in the scientific literature and holds over 22 US patents. He is a member of the National Academy of Sciences.
