= Hexyllithium =

n-Hexyllithium

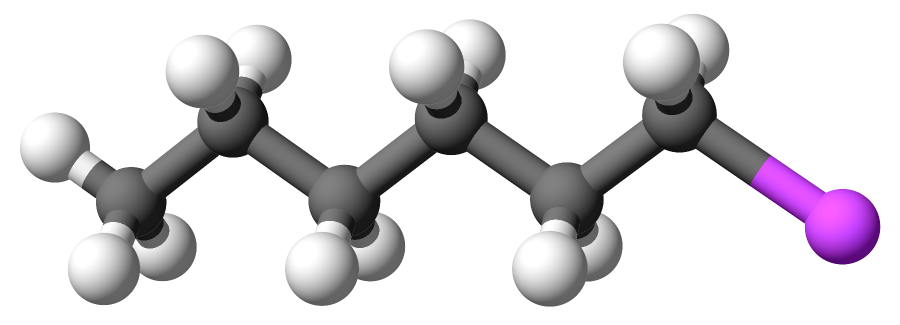

Names
- IUPAC name Hexyllithium
- Other names HxLi, NHL

Identifiers
CAS Number	21369-64-2
3D model (JSmol)	Interactive image
Abbreviations	NHL; HxLi n-HxLi nHxLi^{n}HxLi
ChemSpider	10626845
ECHA InfoCard	100.100.655
EC Number	404-950-0
PubChem CID	2733163
CompTox Dashboard (EPA)	DTXSID0074899
- InChI: InChI=1S/C6H13.Li/c1-3-5-6-4-2;/h1,3-6H2,2H3; Key: RMKNFFPDYCVCDI-UHFFFAOYSA-N
- SMILES: [Li+].CCCCC[CH2-]

Properties
Chemical formula	C_{6}H_{13}Li
Molar mass	92.11 g·mol^{−1}
Solubility in water	Reacts with water
Solubility in other solvents	Soluble in hydrocarbons, ether, and THF
Acidity (pK_{a})	approx. 40

Hazards
- GHS labelling
Pictograms	
Signal word	Danger
Hazard statements	H250, H260, H314 (Note: Within the European Union, the following additional hazard statement (EUH014) must also be displayed on labelling: Reacts violently with water.)
Precautionary statements	P210, P222, P223, P231+P232, P260, P264, P280, P301+P330+P331, P302+P334, P303+P361+P353, P304+P340, P305+P351+P338, P310, P321, P335+P334, P363, P370+P378, P402+P404, P405, P422, P501

Related compounds
Related organolithium compounds	Methyllithium n-Butyllithium tert-Butyllithium; Phenyllithium; Neopentyllithium; Propyllithium
- Except where otherwise noted, data are given for materials in their standard state (at 25 °C [77 °F], 100 kPa). Infobox references

n-Hexyllithium, C_{6}H_{13}Li, sometimes abbreviated to HxLi or NHL, is an organolithium compound used in organic synthesis as a strong base or as a lithiation reagent. It is usually encountered as a colorless or pale yellow solution in hexanes. Such solutions are highly sensitive to air and can ignite when treated with water.

In terms of chemical properties, hexyllithium and n-butyllithium (BuLi) are very similar. As a base, hexyllithium generates n-hexane as a byproduct rather than gaseous butane, which results from the use of BuLi. Another advantage for HxLi is that it is slightly less reactive. Both of these aspects encourage industrial applications. It is commercially available as a solution in mixed hexanes, usually at a concentration of about 2 M for laboratory use or 33% for industrial use.

As for BuLi, the structure and formula for HxLi are often depicted as a monomer. Like all organolithium compounds, it exists as clusters in solution and as a solid.
