= Tetrakis(triphenylphosphine)platinum(0) =

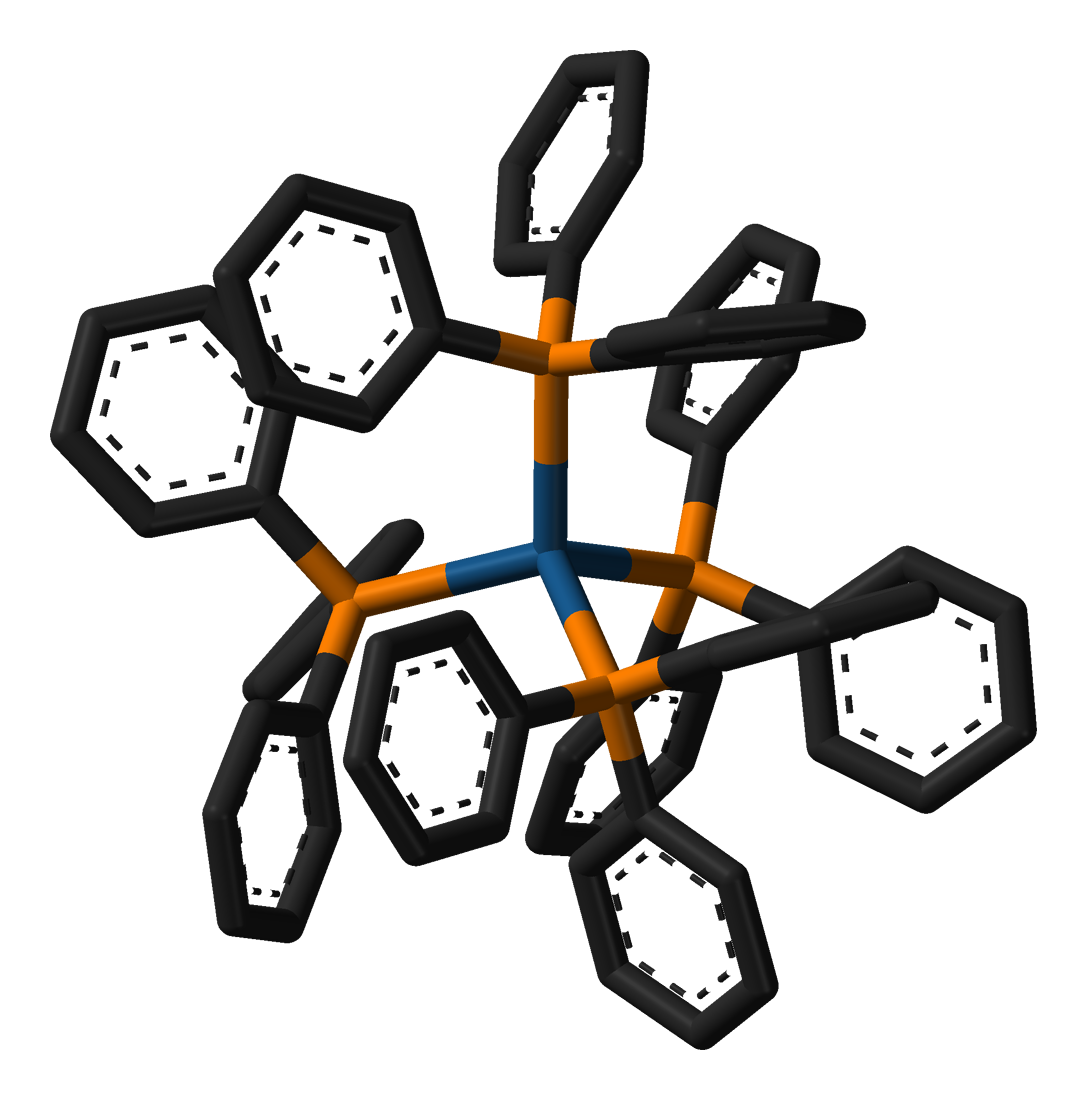
- 3D model of the tetrakis(triphenylphosphine)platinum(0) molecule

Names
- IUPAC name Tetrakis(triphenylphosphane)platinum(0)
- Other names Tetrakis(triphenylphosphane)platinum(0); TPP platinum(0)

Identifiers
CAS Number	14221-02-4
3D model (JSmol)	Interactive image
ChemSpider	10152943
ECHA InfoCard	100.034.610
EC Number	238-087-4
PubChem CID	11979705
CompTox Dashboard (EPA)	DTXSID4065733
- InChI: InChI=1S/4C18H15P.Pt/c4*1-4-10-16(11-5-1)19(17-12-6-2-7-13-17)18-14-8-3-9-15-18;/h4*1-15H; Key: SYKXNRFLNZUGAJ-UHFFFAOYSA-N
- SMILES: c0ccccc0[P+](c0ccccc0)(c0ccccc0)[Pt-4]([P+](c0ccccc0)(c0ccccc0)c0ccccc0)([P+](c0ccccc0)(c0ccccc0)c0ccccc0)[P+](c0ccccc0)(c0ccccc0)c0ccccc0

Properties
Chemical formula	C_{72}H_{60}P_{4}Pt
Molar mass	1244.251 g·mol^{−1}
Appearance	yellow crystals
Melting point	160 °C (320 °F; 433 K)
Solubility in water	Insoluble

Structure
Coordination geometry	four triphenylphosphine unidentate ligands attached to a central Pt(0) atom in a tetrahedral geometry
Molecular shape	tetrahedral
Dipole moment	0 D

Hazards
- Occupational safety and health (OHS/OSH)
Main hazards	PPh_{3} is an irritant
- GHS labelling
Pictograms	(GHS07: Exclamation mark)
Signal word	Warning
Hazard statements	H302
NFPA 704 (fire diamond)	2 1
Safety data sheet (SDS)	External MSDS

Related compounds
Related complexes	Tetrakis(triphenylphosphine)palladium(0); Tetrakis(triphenylphosphine)nickel(0); Tris(triphenylphosphine)platinum(0)
Related compounds	Triphenylphosphine
- Except where otherwise noted, data are given for materials in their standard state (at 25 °C [77 °F], 100 kPa). verify (what is ?) Infobox references

Tetrakis(triphenylphosphine)platinum(0) is the chemical compound with the formula Pt(P(C_{6}H_{5})_{3})_{4}, often abbreviated Pt(PPh_{3})_{4}. The bright yellow compound is used as a precursor to other platinum complexes.

== Structure and behavior ==
The molecule is tetrahedral, as confirmed by X-ray crystallography. The molecule has idealized point group symmetry of T_{d}, as expected for a four-coordinate metal complex of a metal with the d^{10} configuration. Even though this complex follows the 18-electron rule, it dissociates triphenylphosphine in solution to give the 16-electron derivative tris(triphenylphosphine)platinum(0) containing only three PPh_{3} ligands:

Pt(PPh_{3})_{4} → Pt(PPh_{3})_{3} + PPh_{3}

== Synthesis ==
The complex is typically prepared in one-pot reaction from potassium tetrachloroplatinate(II). Reduction of this platinum(II) species with alkaline ethanol in the presence of excess triphenylphosphine affords the product as a precipitate. The reaction occurs in two distinct steps. In the first step, PtCl_{2}(PPh_{3})_{2} is generated. In the second step, this platinum(II) complex is reduced. The overall synthesis can be summarized as:

K_{2}[PtCl_{4}] + 2 KOH + 4 PPh_{3} + C_{2}H_{5}OH → Pt(PPh_{3})_{4} + 4 KCl + CH_{3}CHO + 2 H_{2}O

== Reactions ==
Pt(PPh_{3})_{4} reacts with oxidants to give platinum(II) derivatives:

Pt(PPh_{3})_{4} + Cl_{2} → cis-PtCl_{2}(PPh_{3})_{2} + 2 PPh_{3}

Mineral acids give the corresponding hydride complexes:

Pt(PPh_{3})_{4} + HCl → trans-PtCl(H)(PPh_{3})_{2} + 2 PPh_{3}

The reaction with oxygen affords a dioxygen complex:

Pt(PPh_{3})_{4} + O_{2} → Pt(η^{2}-O_{2})(PPh_{3})_{2} + 2 PPh_{3}

This complex is a precursor to the ethylene complex

Pt(η^{2}-O_{2})(PPh_{3})_{2} + C_{2}H_{4} → Pt(η^{2}-C_{2}H_{4})(PPh_{3})_{2} + "NaBH_{2}(OH)_{2}"
