= Cyclopropylacetylene =

Names
- Preferred IUPAC name Ethynylcyclopropane

Identifiers
CAS Number	6746-94-7
3D model (JSmol)	Interactive image
ChemSpider	122425
ECHA InfoCard	100.102.389
EC Number	425-430-1
PubChem CID	138823
UNII	CYA9F6WH2T
CompTox Dashboard (EPA)	DTXSID80217795
- InChI: InChI=1S/C5H6/c1-2-5-3-4-5/h1,5H,3-4H2 Key: NPTDXPDGUHAFKC-UHFFFAOYSA-N
- SMILES: C#CC1CC1

Properties
Chemical formula	C_{5}H_{6}
Molar mass	66.103 g·mol^{−1}
Appearance	colorless liquid
Density	0.781 g/cm^{3} at 25°C
Boiling point	51–53 °C (124–127 °F; 324–326 K)

Hazards
- GHS labelling
Pictograms	(GHS02: Flammable) (GHS05: Corrosive)
Hazard statements	H225, H315, H319, H412
Precautionary statements	P210, P273, P280, P305+P351+P338
Flash point	−17 °C (1 °F; 256 K)
- Except where otherwise noted, data are given for materials in their standard state (at 25 °C [77 °F], 100 kPa). Infobox references

Cyclopropylacetylene is an hydrocarbon with the chemical formula C_{5}H_{6}. Under normal conditions, the substance is a colorless liquid. Cyclopropylacetylene is a precursor to pharmaceuticals and other organic compounds.

== Synthesis ==
Several methods have been published on the synthesis of cyclopropylacetylene. The earliest preparation starts with the chlorination of cyclopropylmethylketone with phosphorus pentachloride. Thereafter, the reaction product, 1-cyclopropyl-1,1-dichloroethane, is converted into cyclopropylacetylene via double dehydrochlorination. This occurs in presence of a strongly basic solution, such as potassium tert-butoxide in dimethyl sulfoxide:

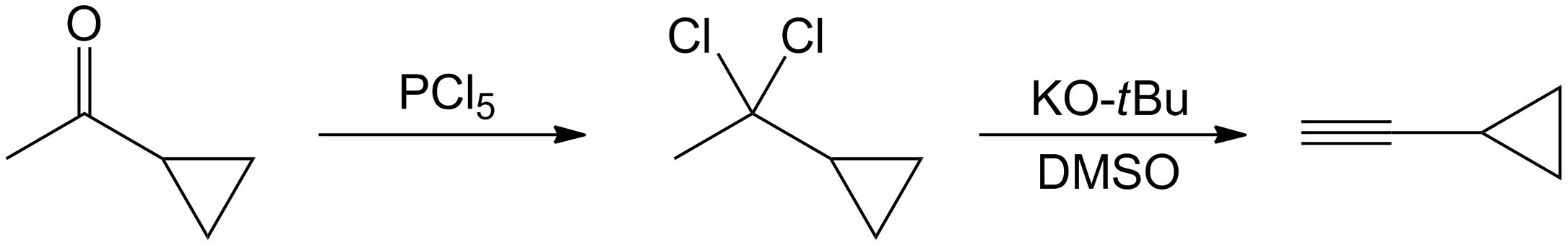
Synthesis scheme 1

However, the yield of this method is not substantial (20-25%). A one-pot synthesis of cyclopropylacetylene has been reported in which 5-chloro-1-pentyne reacts with n-butyl lithium or n-hexyl lithium. Cyclohexane is used as a solvent. The reaction is a metalation followed by a cyclization. The reaction product is then cooled, and an aqueous solution of ammonium chloride is added slowly. There is a two-phase mixture: a heavy water phase and a lighter organic phase containing cyclopropylacetylene.

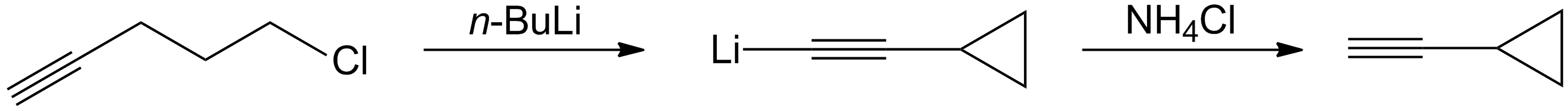
Synthesis scheme 2

== Applications ==
Cyclopropylacetylene is used as reagent in organic reactions. It is, for example, a building block of the antiretroviral and psychotropic drug efavirenz. It can also be used in the azide-alkyne Huisgen cycloaddition.
