= Cyclopropyne =

Names
- Preferred IUPAC name Cyclopropyne

Identifiers
CAS Number	60701-63-5
3D model (JSmol)	Interactive image
PubChem CID	18366129
CompTox Dashboard (EPA)	DTXSID90593158
- InChI: InChI=1S/C3H2/c1-2-3-1/h1H2 Key: WWVWWECUZUPLCL-UHFFFAOYSA-N
- SMILES: C1C#C1

Properties
Chemical formula	C_{3}H_{2}
Molar mass	38.049 g·mol^{−1}
- Except where otherwise noted, data are given for materials in their standard state (at 25 °C [77 °F], 100 kPa). Infobox references

Cyclopropyne is an extremely strained, unstable, and reactive cycloalkyne with the chemical formula C_{3}H_{2}. As the smallest cycloalkyne, it features a three-carbon ring that includes a triple bond. The significant ring strain makes the compound challenging to produce and causes its high reactivity.

== Theoretical studies ==
Although cyclopropyne is inherently unstable, it has been extensively investigated through theoretical studies aimed at exploring its electronic structure, energy properties, and vibrational characteristics. A similar compound called silacyclopropyne, in which a silicon atom substitutes one of the carbon atoms in the ring, has been successfully synthesized and examined.

== See also ==
- Cyclopropene
- Cyclopropane
