= Chain walking =

Reaction in polymer chemistry

In polymer chemistry, chain walking (CW) or chain running or chain migration is a mechanism that operates during some alkene polymerization reactions. CW can be also considered as a specific case of intermolecular chain transfer (analogous to radical ethene polymerization). This reaction gives rise to branched and hyperbranched/dendritic hydrocarbon polymers. This process is also characterized by accurate control of polymer architecture and topology. The extent of CW, displayed in the number of branches formed and positions of branches on the polymers are controlled by the choice of a catalyst. The potential applications of polymers formed by this reaction are diverse, from drug delivery to phase transfer agents, nanomaterials, and catalysis.

== Catalysts ==
Nickel(II) and palladium(II) complexes of α-diimine ligands that promote chain walking were discovered in the 1980-1990s. Also referred as Brookhart's catalysts, these complexes allow access to stereo block copolymers by combination of living and stereospecific CW polymerization catalysts. Continuous research effort led to design of other ligands which provide CW polymerization catalysts upon complexation to late transition metals. Examples are β-diimine, α-keto-β-diimine, amine-imine and most recently diamine ligands. As the vast majority of CW polymerization catalysts is based on late-transition metal complexes, having generally lower oxophilicity, these complexes were demonstrated also to provide copolymerisation of olefins with polar monomers like acrylates, alkylvinylketones, ω-alken-1-ols, ω-alken-1-carboxylic acids etc., which was the main initial intention of development of this class of catalysts. These random copolymers could further be utilized in the construction of sophisticated amphiphilic grafted copolymers with hydrophobic polyolefin core and shell based on hydrophilic arms, in some cases made of stimuli-responsive polymers.

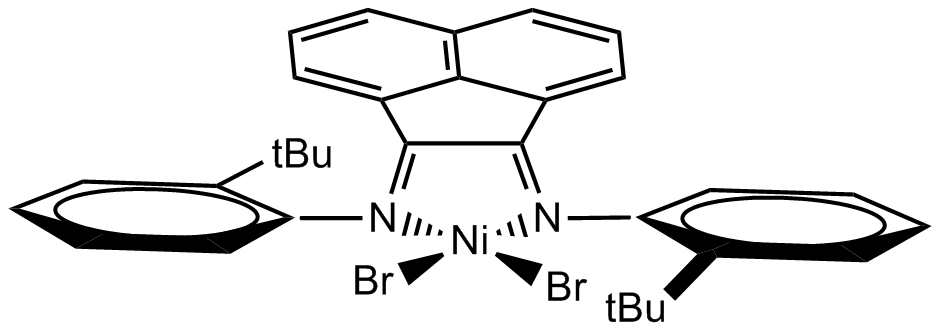
Example of a nickel precatalyst that, upon activation with suitable cocatalyst (MAO, organoaluminiums), promotes chain walking.

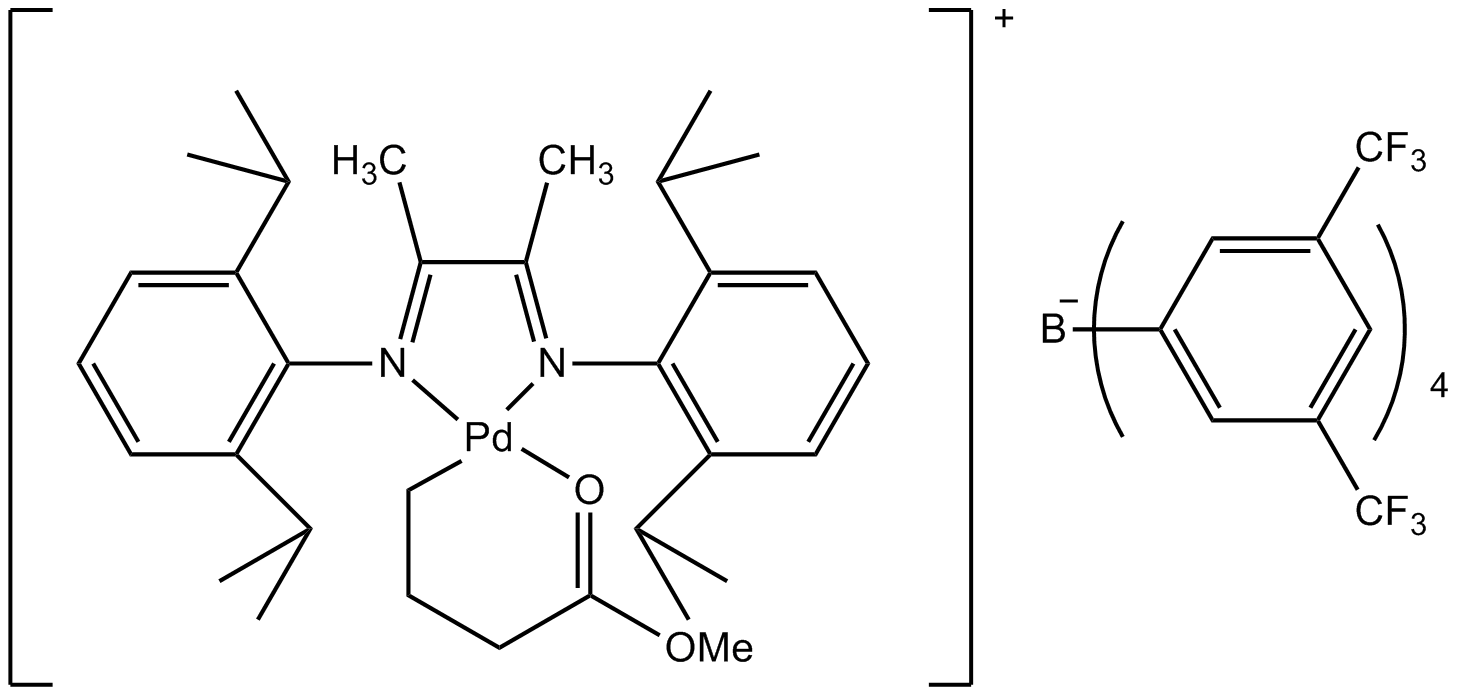
Example of a palladium catalyst that promotes chain walking.

== Mechanism ==
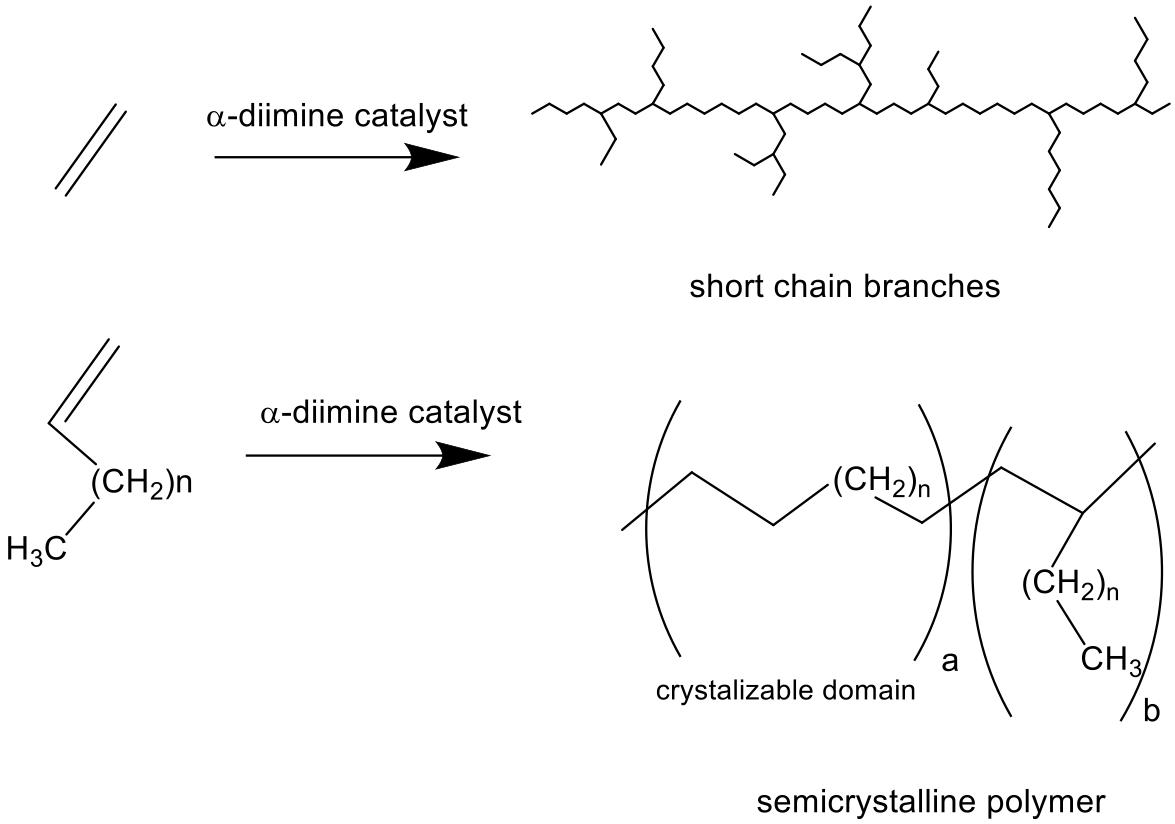
Structure of polymers obtained in CW polymerization of ethene vs. higher olefins

CW occurs after the polymer chain has grown somewhat on the metal catalyst. The precursor is a 16 e^{−} complex with the general formula [ML_{2}(C_{2}H_{4})(chain)]^{+}. The ethylene ligand (the monomer) dissociates to produce a highly unsaturated 14 e^{−} cation. This cation is stabilized by an agostic interaction. β-Hydride elimination then occurs to give a hydride-alkene complex. Subsequent reinsertion of the M-H into the C=C bond, but in the opposite sense gives a metal-alkyl complex.

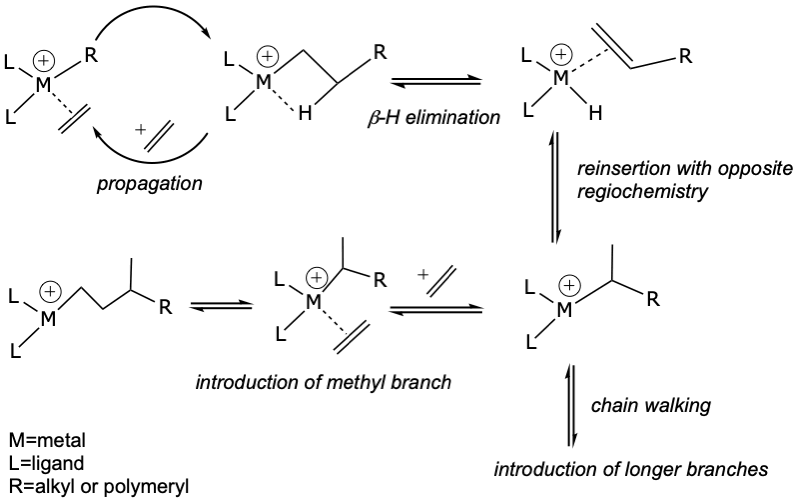
Mechanism of CW ethene polymerization leading to the formation of short chain branches

This process, a step in the chain walk, moves the metal from the end of a chain to a secondary carbon center. At this stage, two options are available: (1) chain walking can continue or (2) a molecule of ethylene can bind to reform the 16e complex. At this second resting state, the ethylene molecule can insert to grow the polymer or dissociate inducing further chain walking. If many branches can form, a hyperbranched topology results. Therefore, ethene only homopolymerization can provide branched polymer whereas the same mechanism leads to chain straightening in α-olefin polymerization. The variation of CW by changing T, monomer concentration, or catalyst switch can be used to produce block copolymer with amorphous and semi-crystalline blocks or with blocks of different topology.

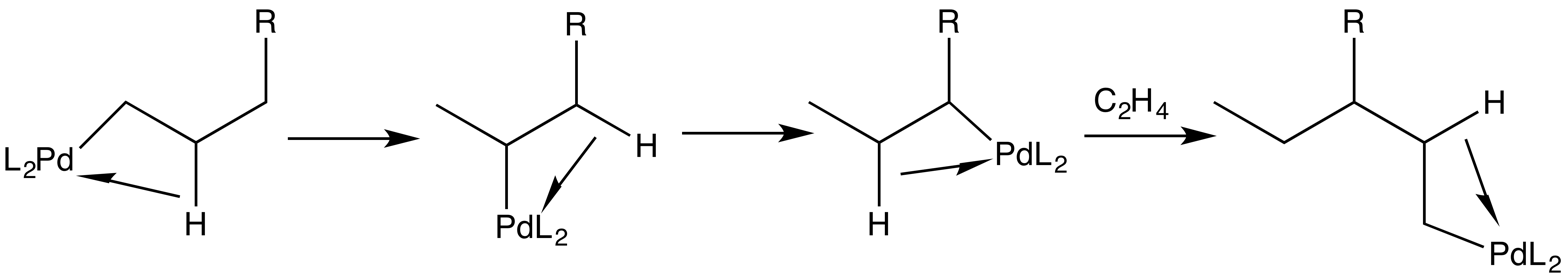
