= Neopentyllithium =

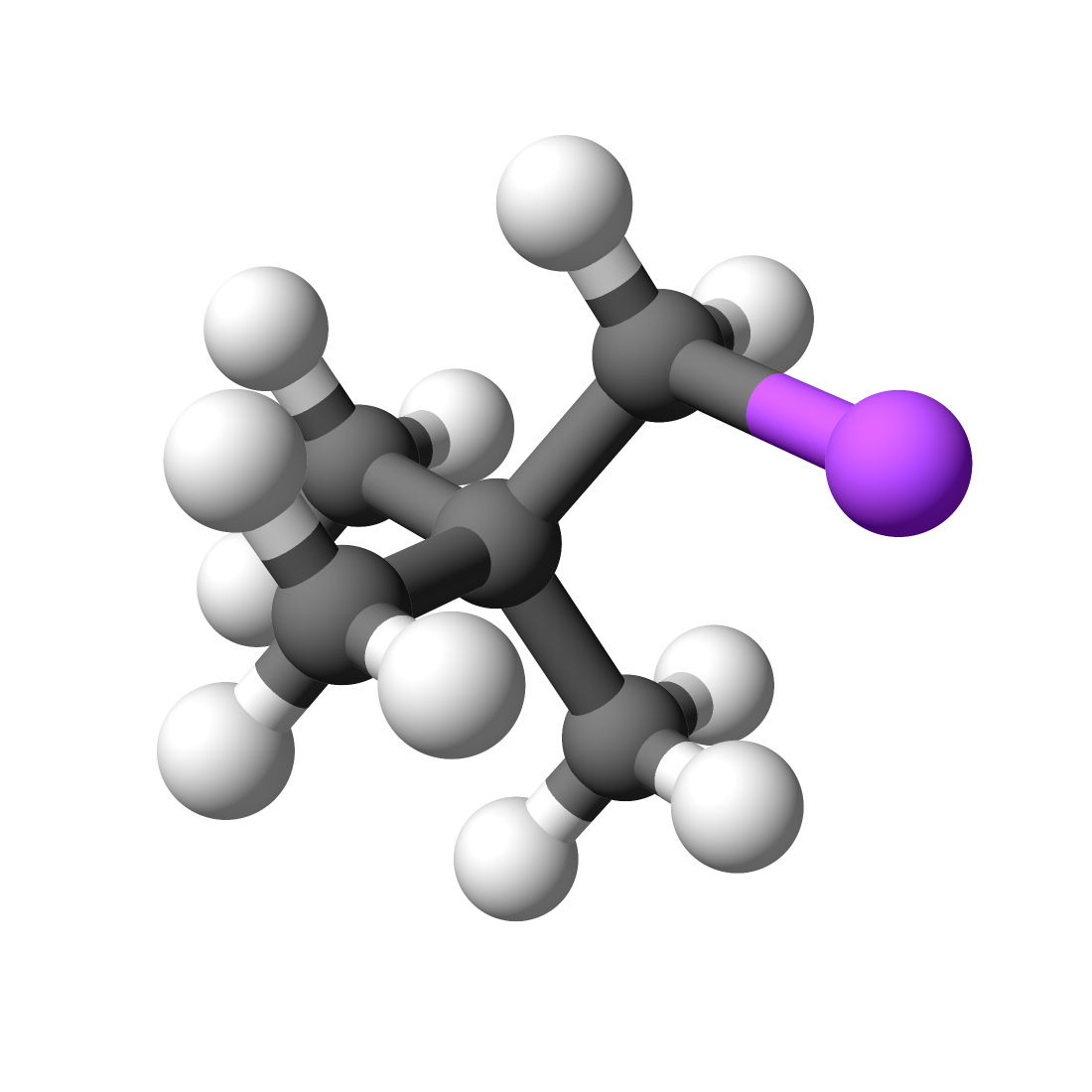

Names
- IUPAC name Neopentyllithium
- Preferred IUPAC name 2,2-Dimethylpropyllithium

Identifiers
CAS Number	7412-67-1
3D model (JSmol)	Interactive image
ChemSpider	10660196
ECHA InfoCard	100.212.899
PubChem CID	10898631
UNII	Y3X266EZG5
CompTox Dashboard (EPA)	DTXSID80447510
- InChI: InChI=1S/C5H11.Li/c1-5(2,3)4;/h1H2,2-4H3; Key: UWLFCNHEPBTLHT-UHFFFAOYSA-N; InChI=1/C5H11.Li/c1-5(2,3)4;/h1H2,2-4H3;/rC5H11Li/c1-5(2,3)4-6/h4H2,1-3H3 Key: UWLFCNHEPBTLHT-OBZUOXEOAE
- SMILES: CC(C)(C)C[Li]

Properties
Chemical formula	C_{5}H_{11}Li
Molar mass	78.08 g·mol^{−1}
Melting point	145.71 °C (294.28 °F; 418.86 K)
Boiling point	389.39 °C (732.90 °F; 662.54 K)
Solubility in water	Decomposes
Solubility	Hydrocarbons, THF, ether
- Except where otherwise noted, data are given for materials in their standard state (at 25 °C [77 °F], 100 kPa). verify (what is ?) Infobox references

Neopentyllithium is an organolithium compound with the chemical formula C_{5}H_{11}Li. Commercially available, it is a strong, non-nucleophilic base sometimes encountered in organometallic chemistry.
