= Mandelamide amidase =

Class of enzymes

Identifiers
- EC no.: 3.5.1.86

Databases
- BRENDA: enzyme data
- ExPASy: NiceZyme view
- KEGG: enzyme entry
- MetaCyc: metabolic pathway
- Rhea: reactions
- PDB structures: RCSB PDB PDBe PDBsum
- Gene Ontology: AmiGO / QuickGO
Search
- PMC: articles
- PubMed: articles
- NCBI: proteins

Mandelamide amidase (EC 3.5.1.86) is an enzyme characterised from Alcaligenes faecalis that hydrolyses the (R) enantiomer of mandelamide to (R)-mandelic acid and ammonia:

(R)-mandelamide
H_{2}O
NH_{3}
(R)-mandelic acid

This enzyme is a hydrolase, one acting on carbon-nitrogen bonds other than peptide bonds, specifically in linear amides. The systematic name of this enzyme class is mandelamide hydrolase. This enzyme is also called Pseudomonas mandelamide hydrolase.
