= Tris(triphenylphosphine)platinum(0) =

Identifiers
CAS Number	13517-35-6
3D model (JSmol)	Interactive image
ChemSpider	9073615
PubChem CID	10898355
CompTox Dashboard (EPA)	DTXSID10447508
- InChI: InChI=1S/3C18H15P.Pt/c3*1-4-10-16(11-5-1)19(17-12-6-2-7-13-17)18-14-8-3-9-15-18;/h3*1-15H; Key: USDYNYGJOWWFKL-UHFFFAOYSA-N
- SMILES: C1=CC=C(C=C1)P(C2=CC=CC=C2)C3=CC=CC=C3.C1=CC=C(C=C1)P(C2=CC=CC=C2)C3=CC=CC=C3.C1=CC=C(C=C1)P(C2=CC=CC=C2)C3=CC=CC=C3.[Pt]

Properties
Chemical formula	C_{54}H_{45}P_{3}Pt
Molar mass	981.959 g·mol^{−1}
Appearance	orange solid
Density	1.45 g/cm^{3}
- Except where otherwise noted, data are given for materials in their standard state (at 25 °C [77 °F], 100 kPa). Infobox references

Tris(triphenylphosphine)platinum(0) is the coordination compound with the formula Pt(P(C_{6}H_{5})_{3})_{3}, often abbreviated Pt(PPh_{3})_{3}. The golden-orange compound is used as a precursor to other platinum complexes.

== Structure ==
The PtP_{3} core of the molecule is planar. According to X-ray crystallography, the Pt–P distances are 226 picometers, which are 10 pm shorter than ing the more crowded tetrakis(triphenylphosphine)platinum(0)

== Synthesis and reactions ==
The complex is typically prepared by recrystallizing tetrakis(triphenylphosphine)platinum from hot ethanol. This 16-electron complex binds triphenylphosphine to give the 18-electron derivative tetrakis(triphenylphosphine)platinum(0), which is tetrahedral:

Pt[P(C_{6}H_{5})_{3}]_{3} + P(C_{6}H_{5})_{3} ⇌ Pt[P(C_{6}H_{5})_{3}]_{4}

The complex reacts very similarly to tetrakis(triphenylphosphine)platinum to give platinum(II) derivatives:

Pt[P(C_{6}H_{5})_{3}]_{3} + Cl_{2} → PtCl_{2}[P(C_{6}H_{5})_{3}]_{2} + P(C_{6}H_{5})_{3}

Bronsted acids give the corresponding hydride complexes:

Pt[P(C_{6}H_{5})_{3}]_{3} + HCl → PtHCl[P(C_{6}H_{5})_{3}]_{2} + P(C_{6}H_{5})_{3}

The reaction with oxygen affords a dioxygen complex:

Pt[P(C_{6}H_{5})_{3}]_{3} + O_{2} → Pt(O_{2})[P(C_{6}H_{5})_{3}]_{2} + P(C_{6}H_{5})_{3}
