= Β-Hydride elimination =

Chemical reaction

β-Hydride elimination is a reaction in which a metal-alkyl centre is converted into the corresponding metal-hydride-alkene. β-Hydride elimination can also occur for many alkoxide complexes as well. The main requirements are that the alkyl group possess a C-H bond β to the metal and that the metal be coordinatively unsaturated. Thus, metal-butyl complexes are susceptible to this reaction whereas metal-methyl complexes are not. The complex must have an empty (or vacant) site cis to the alkyl group for this reaction to occur. β-Hydride elimination, which can be desirable or undesirable, affects the behavior of many organometallic complexes.

Moreover, for facile cleavage of the C–H bond, a d electron pair is needed for donation into the σ* orbital of the C–H bond. Thus, d^{0} metals alkyls are generally more stable to β-hydride elimination than d^{2} and higher metal alkyls and may form isolable agostic complexes, even if an empty coordination site is available.

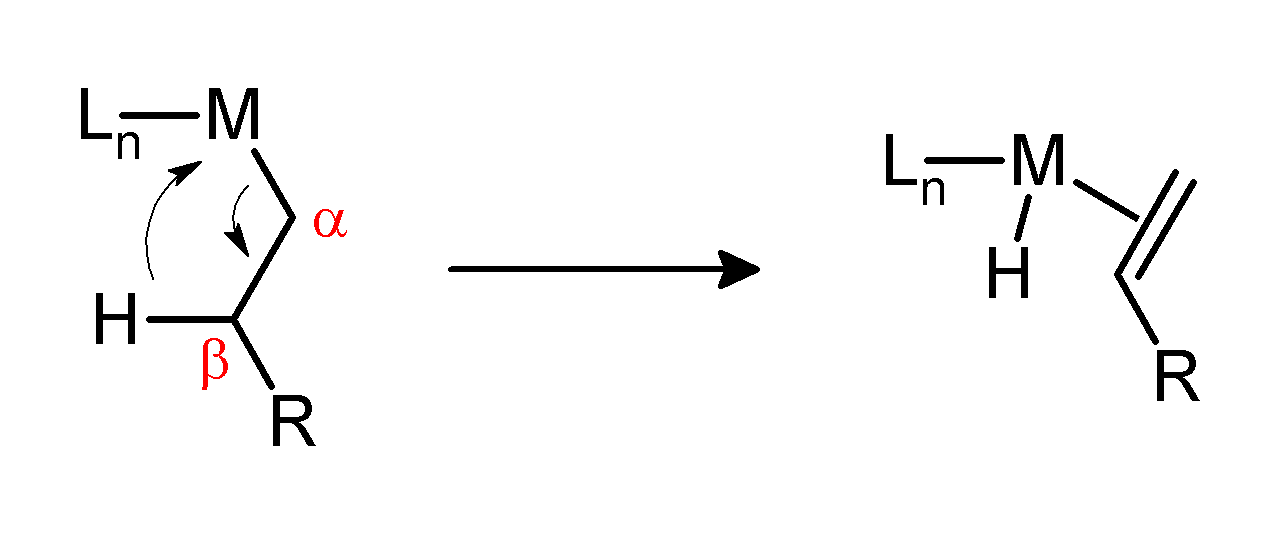

== Role of β-hydride elimination ==
The Shell higher olefin process relies on β-hydride elimination to produce α-olefins which are used to produce detergents.

β-Hydride elimination interferes with the Ziegler–Natta polymerization, leading to decreased molecular weight. The production of branched polymers from ethylene relies on chain walking, a key step of which is β-hydride elimination.

Nickel- and palladium-catalyzed couplings mainly focus on aryl-aryl couplings. Aryl-alkyl and especially alkyl-alkyl couplings are less successful because of β-hydride elimination can lower the yield.

In Hydroformylation, β-hydride elimination can act as a side reaction that influences product regioselectivity. For example, in the hydroformylation of open chain unsaturated ethers, it reverses the formation of branched metal-alkyl intermediates at high temperatures, leading to a greater yield of linear products.

β-Hydride elimination is one step in the synthesis of some metal hydrides. For instance in the synthesis of RuHCl(CO)(PPh_{3})_{3} from ruthenium trichloride, triphenylphosphine and 2-methoxyethanol, an intermediate alkoxide complex undergoes a β-hydride elimination to form the hydride ligand and the pi-bonded aldehyde which then is later converted into the carbonyl (carbon monoxide) ligand.

== Mechanism ==
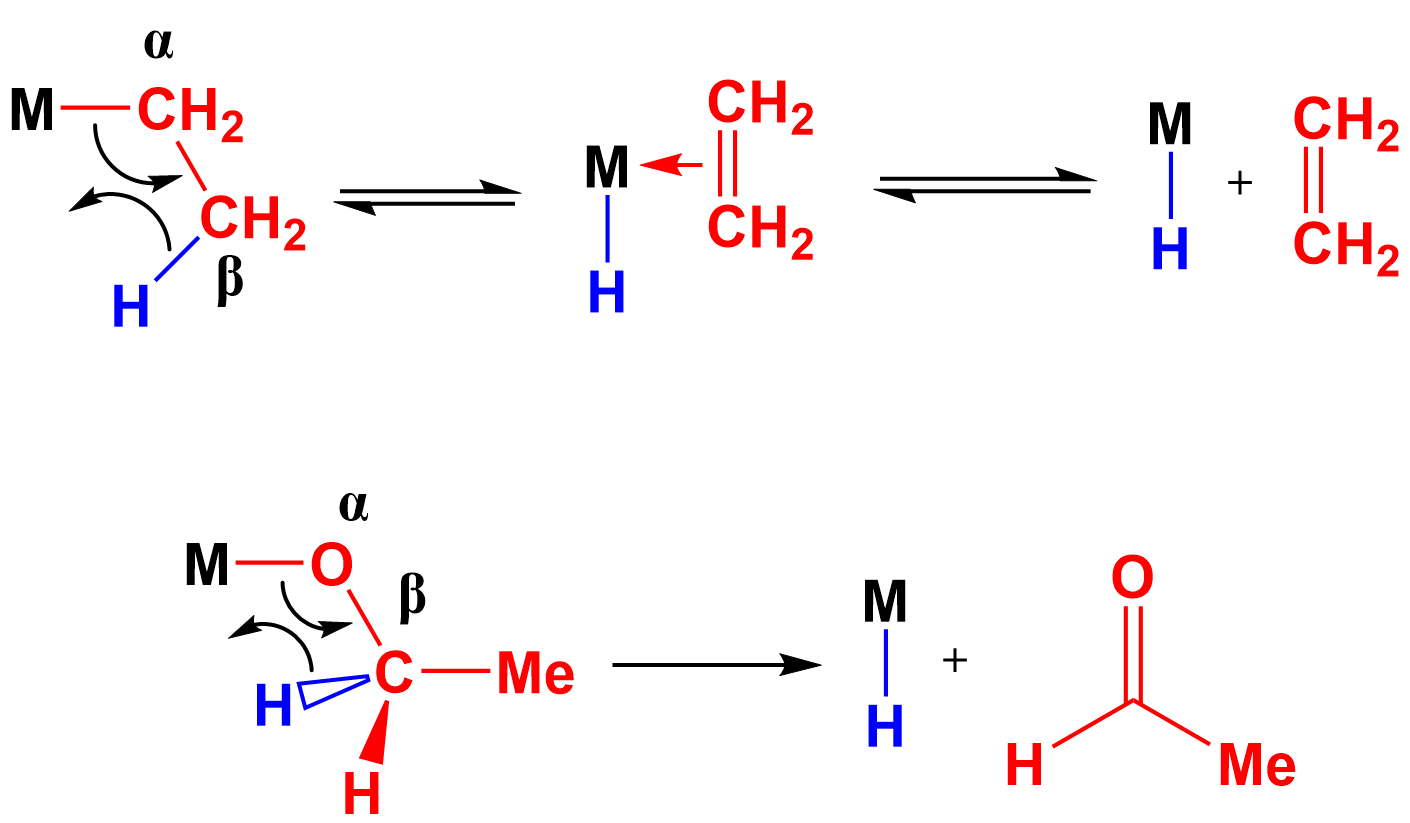
Top: the β-hydride elimination of an alkyl ligand. Bottom: the β-hydride elimination of an alkoxide ligand.

β-Hydride elimination transforms a metal-alkyl complex into a metal-hydrido-alkene complex. Starting with an unsaturated complex, the transformation proceeds in stages: 1) Dissociation of a ligand from a metal alkyl complex, yielding a coordinatively unsaturated derivative. 2) Alignment of the beta hydrogen. In this step, a vacant site on the metal forms an agostic complex by binding a C-H bond of the alkyl (or alkoxide). 3) Hydride Transfer/Alkene Formation. In this step, the M-H bond forms concomitant with cleavage of a C-H bond and the development of a double bond in what was once an alkyl (or alkoxide) ligand. The resulting metal hydride can eliminate the alkene ligand. The transition state for this β-hydride elimination involves a 4-membered ring.

=== Non-dissociative ===
Especially for Pt(II) complexes, β-hydride eliminations may occur without the dissociation of an ancillary ligand. This was suggested primarily based on the observed order of the L-type ligand in the rate law derived from kinetic studies. This mechanism appears to be operative for the minority of reactions studied.

== Structure-reactivity relationships ==
Relative to an arbitrary reference complex, β-hydride elimination is faster in a complex with the following characteristics:

- More electron-deficient metal center. This can be as a result of less donating ancillary ligands.
- More labile ancillary ligands, such as weakly coordinating (e.g. solvent) or sterically demanding ligands.
- The abstracted H is more hydridic (has a higher pKa).

== Avoiding β-hydride elimination ==
Several strategies exist for avoiding β-hydride elimination. The most common strategy is to employ alkyl ligands that lack hydrogen atoms at the β position. Common substituents include methyl and neopentyl. β-Hydride elimination is also inhibited when the reaction would produce a strained alkene. This situation is illustrated by the stability of metal complexes containing norbornyl ligands, where the β-hydride elimination product would violate Bredt's rule.

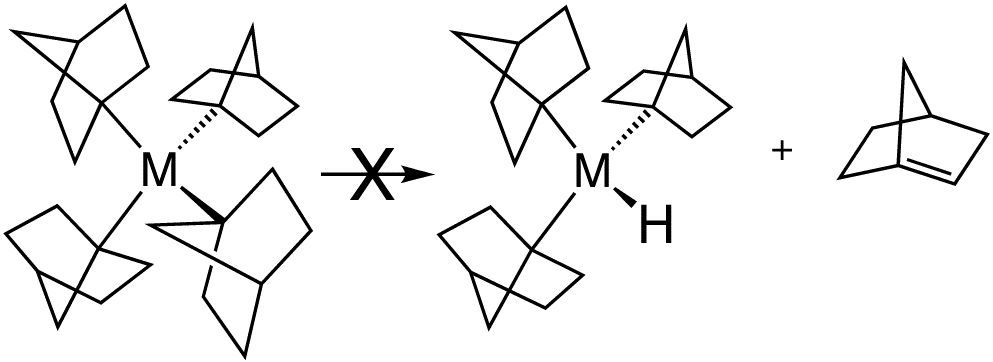
