= Polyketone =

Family of plastic polymers

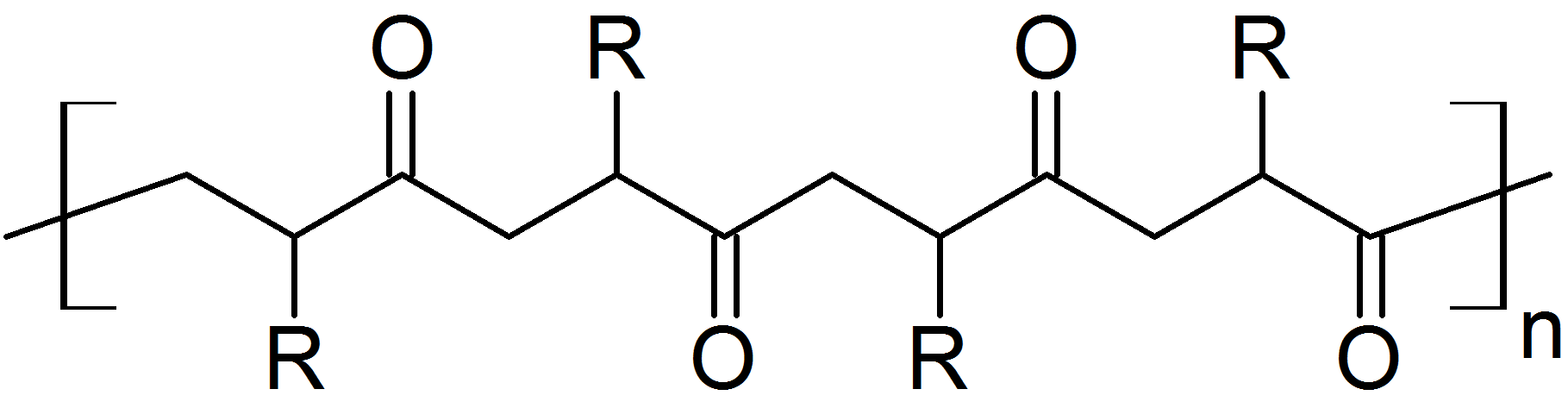
General chemical structure of a polyketone. In practice, R is usually H.

Polyketones (POK) are a family of high-performance thermoplastic polymers. The polar ketone groups in the polymer backbone of these materials gives rise to a strong attraction between polymer chains, which increases the material's melting point (255 °C for copolymer (carbon monoxide ethylene), 220 °C for terpolymer (carbon monoxide, ethylene, propylene). Trade names include Poketone, Carilon, Karilon, Akrotek, and Schulaketon. Such materials also tend to resist solvents and have good mechanical properties. Unlike many other engineering plastics, aliphatic polyketones such as Shell Chemicals' Carilon are relatively easy to synthesize and can be derived from inexpensive monomers. Carilon is made with a palladium(II) catalyst from ethylene and carbon monoxide. A small fraction of the ethylene is generally replaced with propylene to reduce the melting point somewhat. Shell Chemical commercially launched Carilon thermoplastic polymer in the U.S. in 1996, but discontinued it in 2000. Hyosung announced that they would launch production in 2015.

Industrially, the ethylene-carbon monoxide co-polymer is most significant. This polymer is synthesized either as a methanol slurry, or via a gas phase reaction with immobilized catalysts.

== Polymerization mechanism ==
=== Initiation and termination ===
Where external initiation is not employed for the methanol system, initiation can take place via methanolysis of the palladium(II) precursor, giving either a methoxide or a hydride complex. Termination occurs also by methanolysis. Depending on the end of the growing polymer chain, this results in either an ester or a ketone end group, and regenerating the palladium methoxide or hydride catalysts respectively.

=== Propagation ===
A mechanism for the propagation of this reaction using a palladium(II)-phenanthroline catalyst has been proposed by Maurice Brookhart:

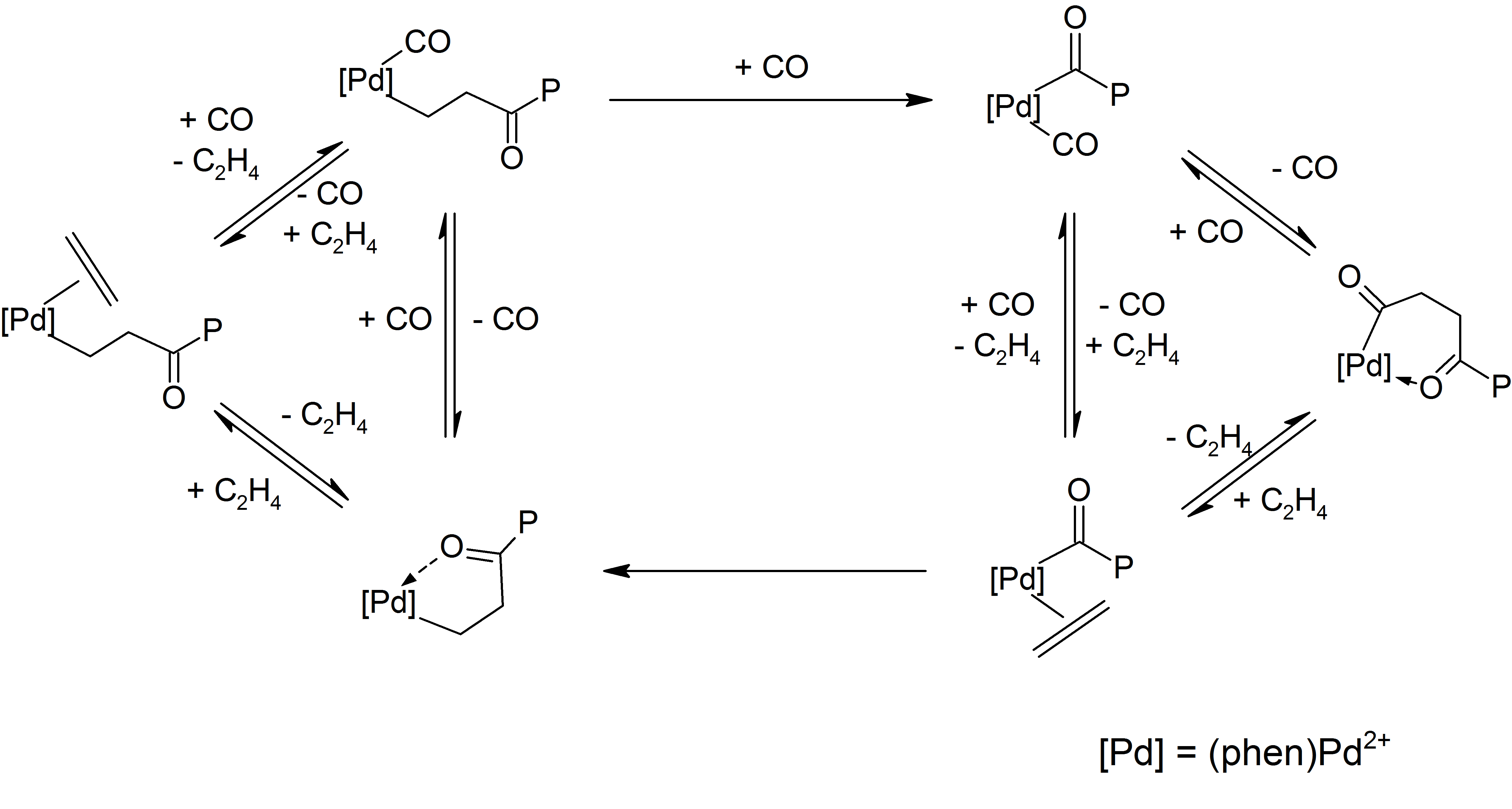

Polyketones are noted for having extremely low defects (double ethylene insertions or double carbonyl insertions, in red):

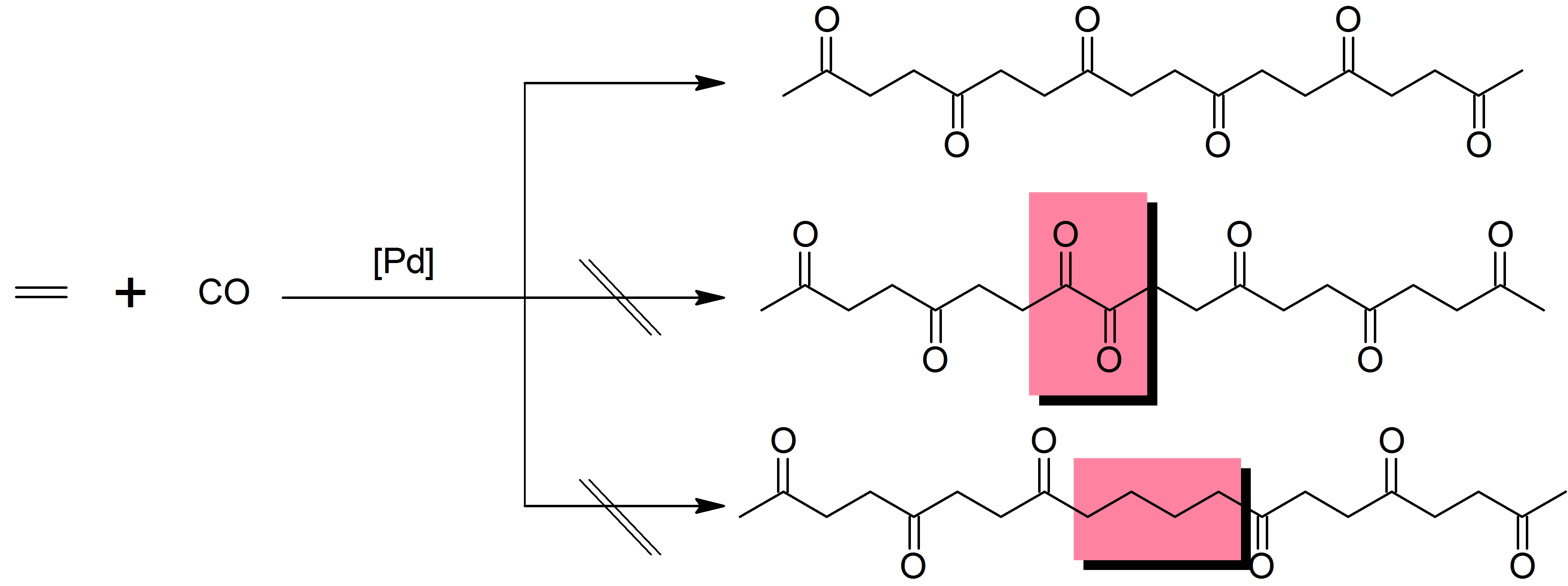

The activation barrier to give double carbonyl insertions is very high, so it does not occur. Brookhart's mechanistic studies show that the concentration of the alkyl-ethylene palladium complex required to give double ethylene insertions is very low at any one point:

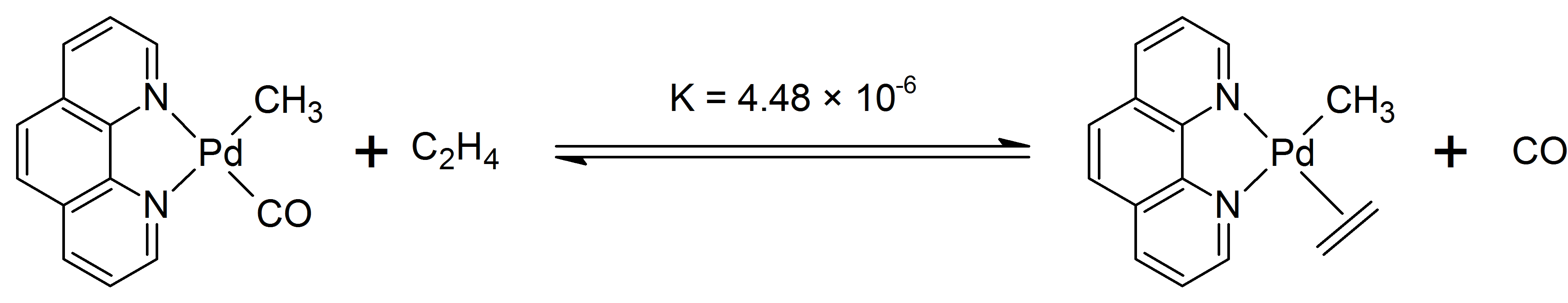

Additionally, the Gibbs energy of activation of the alkyl-ethylene insertion is ~ 3 kcal/mol higher than the corresponding activation barrier for the alkyl-carbon monoxide insertion. As a result, defects occur at an extremely low rate (~ 1 part per million). The industrially-relevant palladium-dppp catalyst has also been investigated.

=== Importance of bidentate ligands ===
Where palladium(II) pre-catalysts bearing monodentate phosphine ligands are used in methanol, a relatively high fraction of methyl propionate is produced. In comparison, where chelating diphosphine ligands are used, this side-product is absent. This observation is rationalized: the bis(phosphine) complex can undergo cis-trans isomerization to give the sterically favored trans isomer. The propionyl ligand is now trans- to the open coordination site or ethylene ligand, and is unable to undergo migratory insertion. Instead, solvolysis by methanol occurs, which gives the undesired methyl propionate side-product.

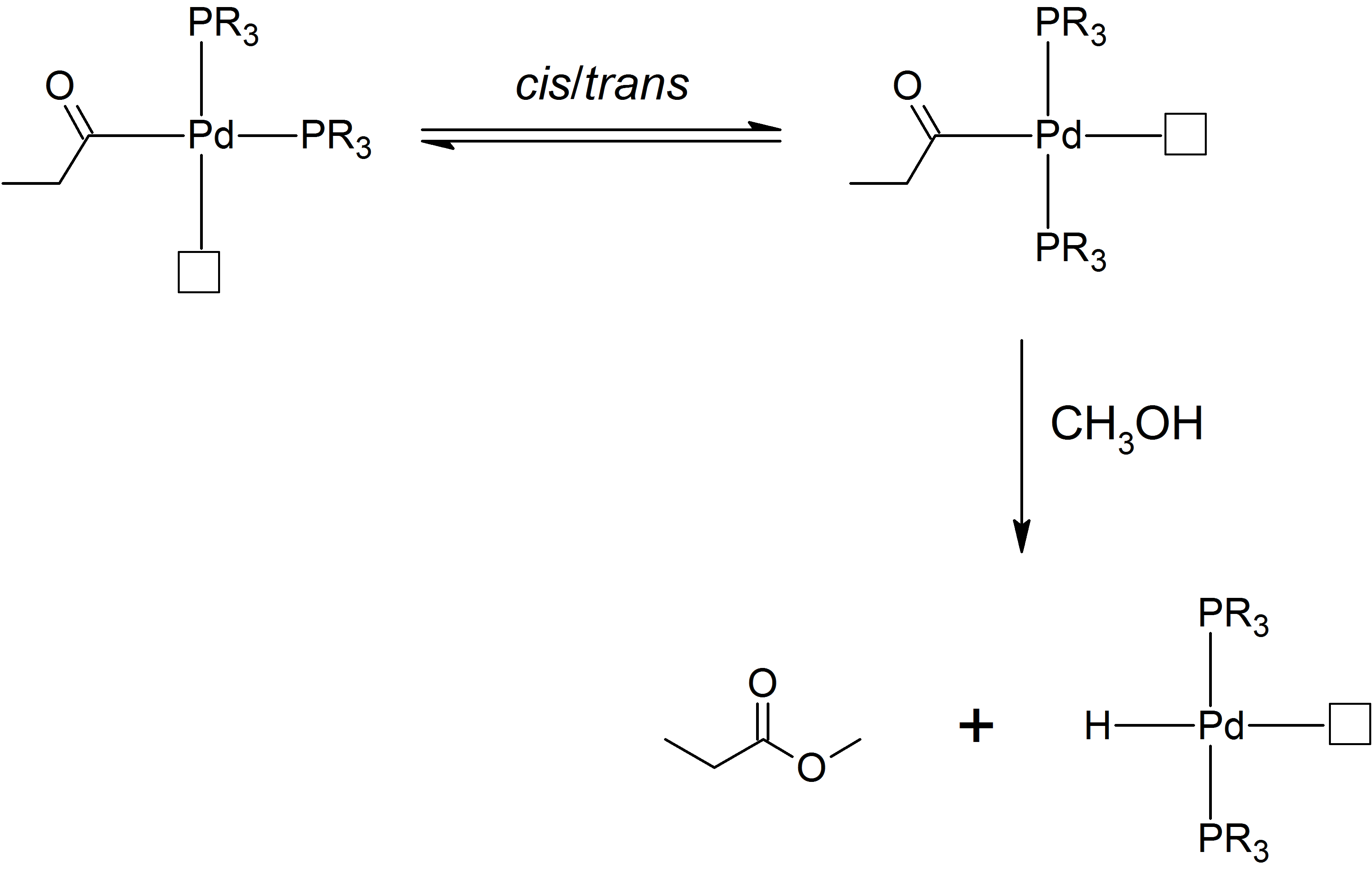

Whereas much effort has involved discrete palladium complexes, an example in the patent literature claims that a combination of Lewis acid (aluminum, iron, or titanium halide) and a source of palladium (as a salt or the metal) is effective for making polyketone.
