= 1,4-Cycloheptadiene =

- skeletal formula

Names
- Preferred IUPAC name Cyclohepta-1,4-diene
- Other names 1,4-Cycloheptadiene

Identifiers
CAS Number	7161-35-5
3D model (JSmol)	Interactive image
Abbreviations	1,4-CHDN
ChemSpider	122548
MeSH	1,4-cycloheptadiene
PubChem CID	138950
UNII	EFF73R8YGV
UN number	3295
CompTox Dashboard (EPA)	DTXSID00221859
- InChI: Key: HQGYGGZHZWXFSI-UHFFFAOYSA-N; InChI=1S/C7H10/c1-2-4-6-7-5-3-1/h1-2,5,7H,3-4,6H2
- SMILES: C1CC=CCC=C1

Properties
Chemical formula	C_{7}H_{10}
Molar mass	94.157 g·mol^{−1}
Appearance	Colorless liquid
Density	0.84 g cm^{−3}
Boiling point	−150.445 °C; −238.801 °F; 122.705 K
Refractive index (n_{D})	1.48

Hazards
- GHS labelling
Pictograms	(GHS02: Flammable) (GHS08: Health hazard)
Signal word	Danger
Hazard statements	H225, H340, H350, H373
Precautionary statements	P201, P210, P308+P313
NFPA 704 (fire diamond)	2 3 0
Flash point	6.293 °C (43.327 °F; 279.443 K)
- Except where otherwise noted, data are given for materials in their standard state (at 25 °C [77 °F], 100 kPa). Infobox references

1,4-Cycloheptadiene is a highly flammable cycloalkene that occurs as a colorless clear liquid. It can form a yellow complex with palladium.
