= 1,3-Cycloheptadiene =

- ball-and-stick structure, cis-cis isomer

Names
- Preferred IUPAC name Cyclohepta-1,3-diene
- Other names 1,3-Cycloheptadiene

Identifiers
CAS Number	4054-38-0
3D model (JSmol)	Interactive image
Abbreviations	1,3-CHDN
Beilstein Reference	1900733
ChemSpider	1847604
ECHA InfoCard	100.021.603
EC Number	223-762-8
Gmelin Reference	1656
MeSH	1,3-cycloheptadiene
PubChem CID	19969
UNII	J778DM7DZN
UN number	3295
CompTox Dashboard (EPA)	DTXSID40193566
- InChI: InChI=1S/C7H10/c1-2-4-6-7-5-3-1/h1-4H,5-7H2 Key: GWYPDXLJACEENP-UHFFFAOYSA-N
- SMILES: C1CC=CC=CC1

Properties
Chemical formula	C_{7}H_{10}
Molar mass	94.157 g·mol^{−1}
Appearance	Colorless liquid
Density	0.868 g cm^{−3}
Melting point	−110.40 °C; −166.72 °F; 162.75 K
Boiling point	120.6 °C; 249.0 °F; 393.7 K
Refractive index (n_{D})	1.498

Thermochemistry
Heat capacity (C)	J K^{−1} mol^{−1}
Std molar entropy (S^{⦵}_{298})	J K^{−1} mol^{−1}
Std enthalpy of formation (Δ_{f}H^{⦵}_{298})	kJ mol^{−1}
Std enthalpy of combustion (Δ_{c}H^{⦵}_{298})	kJ mol^{−1}

Hazards
- GHS labelling
Pictograms	(GHS02: Flammable) (GHS08: Health hazard)
Signal word	Danger
Hazard statements	H225, H340, H350, H373
Precautionary statements	P201, P210, P308+P313
NFPA 704 (fire diamond)	2 3 0
Flash point	11 °C (52 °F; 284 K)
- Except where otherwise noted, data are given for materials in their standard state (at 25 °C [77 °F], 100 kPa). Infobox references

1,3-Cycloheptadiene is a highly flammable cycloalkene that occurs as a colorless clear liquid.

== Reactions ==
Over a heated Pt(111) surface, 1,3-cycloheptadiene binds to the platinum, loses hydrogen to form a cycloheptatriene, and when strongly heated forms a layer of carbon.
