= Cyclononene =

- 1-Cyclononene (Z)-Cyclononene

Names
- IUPAC name (E)-Cyclononene, (Z)-Cyclononene
- Other names cis-Cyclononene, trans-Cyclononene

Identifiers
CAS Number	933-21-1
3D model (JSmol)	Interactive image
ChemSpider	4575884
PubChem CID	5463153
CompTox Dashboard (EPA)	DTXSID201316842
- InChI: InChI=1S/C9H16/c1-2-4-6-8-9-7-5-3-1/h1-2H,3-9H2/b2-1- Key: BESIOWGPXPAVOS-UPHRSURJSA-N
- SMILES: C\1=C\CCCCCCC/1

Properties
Chemical formula	C_{9}H_{16}
Molar mass	124.227 g·mol^{−1}
Density	0.812 g/mL
Boiling point	106 °C (223 °F; 379 K)

Hazards
Flash point	41 °C (106 °F; 314 K)
- Except where otherwise noted, data are given for materials in their standard state (at 25 °C [77 °F], 100 kPa). Infobox references

Cyclononene is a cycloalkene with a nine-membered ring, with two possible geometric isomers, denoted cis-cyclononene and trans-cyclononene, or (Z)-cyclononene and (E)-cyclononene.
