= Cyclobutyne =

Names
- Preferred IUPAC name Cyclobutyne

Identifiers
CAS Number	1191-94-2
3D model (JSmol)	Interactive image
ChemSpider	10637133
PubChem CID	20072734
CompTox Dashboard (EPA)	DTXSID80602147
- InChI: InChI=1S/C4H4/c1-2-4-3-1/h1-2H2 Key: DRFGMUMDUXDALH-UHFFFAOYSA-N
- SMILES: C1#CCC1

Properties
Chemical formula	C_{4}H_{4}
Molar mass	52.076 g·mol^{−1}
- Except where otherwise noted, data are given for materials in their standard state (at 25 °C [77 °F], 100 kPa). verify (what is ?) Infobox references

Cyclobutyne (C_{4}H_{4}) is a hydrocarbon molecule containing a triple bond within a four carbon atom ring. This cycloalkyne is very unstable due to its high ring strain and has not been isolated in the pure state. However, osmium coordination complexes containing cyclobutyne have been synthesized.

== See also ==
- Cyclobutene
- Cyclobutane
