= Cyclooctyne =

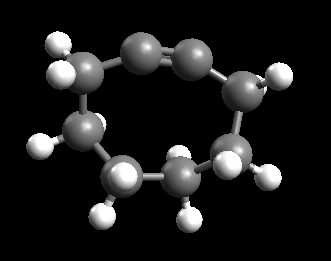

Identifiers
CAS Number	1781-78-8
3D model (JSmol)	Interactive image
Beilstein Reference	1209275
ChEBI	CHEBI:37815
ChemSpider	120907
PubChem CID	137207
UNII	35MR2L5G3W
CompTox Dashboard (EPA)	DTXSID50170424
- InChI: InChI=1S/C8H12/c1-2-4-6-8-7-5-3-1/h1-6H2 Key: ZPWOOKQUDFIEIX-UHFFFAOYSA-N
- SMILES: C1CCCC#CCC1

Properties
Chemical formula	C_{8}H_{12}
Molar mass	108.184 g·mol^{−1}
- Except where otherwise noted, data are given for materials in their standard state (at 25 °C [77 °F], 100 kPa). Infobox references

Cyclooctyne is the cycloalkyne with a formula C_{8}H_{12}. Its molecule has a ring of 8 carbon atoms, connected by seven single bonds and one triple bond.

Cyclooctyne is the smallest cycloalkyne that is stable enough to be isolated, although the chemical is still highly reactive. The alkyne region of the structure attempts to adopt a linear molecular geometry, but the nature of the ring creates substantial ring strain. As a result, cyclooctyne and other compounds containing this ring structure readily react in ways that reduce the ring strain by converting the alkyne to a functional group that does not require linear geometry. An important application of this reactivity is in click chemistry, where cyclooctynes undergo cycloaddition reactions with azides or nitrones, forming triazoles or isoxazolines, respectively.
