= Cyclopentyne =

Names
- Preferred IUPAC name Cyclopentyne

Identifiers
CAS Number	1120-58-7
3D model (JSmol)	Interactive image
PubChem CID	14093813
UNII	YW3RQN2WZY
CompTox Dashboard (EPA)	DTXSID10555814
- InChI: InChI=1S/C5H6/c1-2-4-5-3-1/h1-3H2 Key: CPGPQFYAGKHQTB-UHFFFAOYSA-N
- SMILES: C1CC#CC1

Properties
Chemical formula	C_{5}H_{6}
Molar mass	66.103 g·mol^{−1}
- Except where otherwise noted, data are given for materials in their standard state (at 25 °C [77 °F], 100 kPa). Infobox references

Cyclopentyne is a cycloalkyne containing five carbon atoms in the ring. Due to the ideal bond angle of 180° at each atom of the alkyne but the structural requirement that the bonds form a ring, this chemical is a highly strained structure, and the triple bond is highly reactive. The triple bond easily undergoes both [2+2] and [4+2] cycloaddition reactions. Unlike benzyne, which undergoes a [2+2] addition with loss of stereochemistry at the alkene partner, cyclopentyne reacts with alkenes with retention of geometry of the partner, an example of the relevance of orbital symmetry even for highly reactive structures. The structure can also form a π complex with lithium cations, which affects the cycloaddition reactivity. It can even interact strongly enough with copper species to form a novel type of metallacycle.
