= John P. Wolfe =

John Perry Wolfe
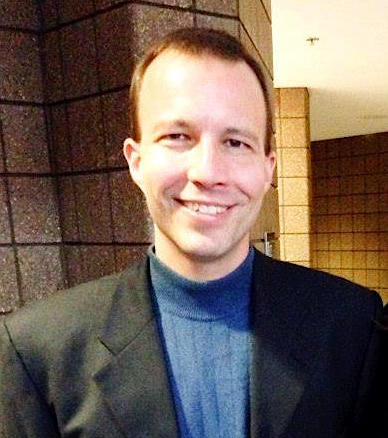
- Wolfe in 2014
- Born: August 12, 1970 (age 56); Greeley, Colorado, US
- Education: MIT (Ph.D.); University of Colorado, Boulder (B.A.)
- Awards: Camille Dreyfus Teacher-Scholar Award (2006)
- Scientific career
- Fields: Organic chemistry, Organometallic chemistry, New Synthetic Methods, Catalysis, Natural Product Synthesis
- Workplaces: Michigan (2002—); University of California, Irvine
- Doctoral advisor: Stephen L. Buchwald
- Other academic advisors: Larry E. Overman

John Perry Wolfe (born August 12, 1970) is an American chemist and a professor of chemistry at the University of Michigan. He is best known for palladium-catalyzed C-C and C-N bond formation reactions. He was also one of the key scientists in the development of Buchwald ligands, one of which is appropriately named "JohnPhos" after him. Wolfe has taught at the University of Michigan since 2002.

== Career ==
John P. Wolfe was born in Greeley, Colorado. He graduated from the University of Colorado, Boulder in 1994 with a B.A. in Chemistry. During his undergraduate career, he served as an undergraduate research assistant for Professor Gary A. Molander, focusing on the development of a SmI_{2}-promoted alternative to the cyanoacetic ester synthesis.

After receiving his bachelor's degree from Colorado in 1994, he entered Massachusetts Institute of Technology (MIT), where he later earned his Ph.D. under Professor Stephen L. Buchwald in 1999 . During his five years at MIT, Wolfe co-authored 9 patents and 20 publications. Upon the completion of his Ph.D., he moved to University of California, Irvine, where he joined Professor Larry E. Overman and his research group as a National Institute of Health (NIH) National Research Service Award (NRSA) postdoctoral fellow.

In 2002, Wolfe moved to Ann Arbor, MI, where he joined the University of Michigan faculty. Since then his research has focused on numerous topics in chemistry, which altogether direct towards the development of new metal-catalyzed reactions for the synthesis of interesting, biologically active compounds. At Michigan, Wolfe is one of the most admired professors in the chemistry department for his outstanding lectures, especially in organic chemistry. The University has recognized his contributions by presenting him with teaching awards, and his students quote him as "the best professor [they]'ve had at University of Michigan", "he make[s] organic chemistry fun and not intimidating" and "words cannot express how great of a teacher and person he is".

== Major contributions ==
=== Palladium-catalyzed carboamination ===
John P. Wolfe has developed many palladium-catalyzed alkene carboamination reactions. These reactions contribute greatly to the synthesis of nitrogen heterocycles, which are commonly found in both pharmaceuticals and natural products. Common applications include the synthesis of pyrrolidines, and three-, five-, six- and seven-membered heterocycles such as pyrazolidines, aziridines, morpholines. His scope extends further to polycyclic heterocycles and the total synthesis of (+)-aphanorphine. These alkene aminoarylations take place via the cross-coupling of aryl or alkenyl halides with simple aminoalkene substrates to generate the heterocyclic ring with formation of a C-N bond and a C-C bond.

One area of his works focuses on the Pd(0)-catalyzed alkene aminoarylation:

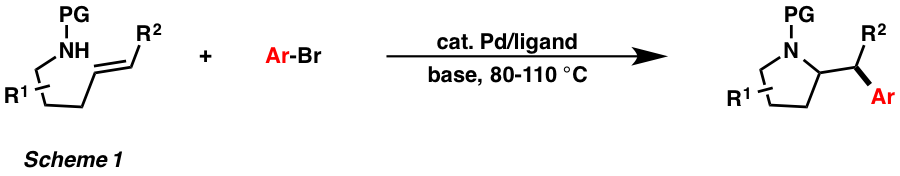
Pd(0)-catalyzed alkene aminoarylation

Pyrrolidines can be efficiently generated via Pd(0)-catalyzed alkene aminoarylation reactions (Scheme 1). The advantages of this method are the wide substrate scope (substrates bearing N-aryl, N-acetyl, N-Boc, and N-Cbz groups) and good stereoselectivity.

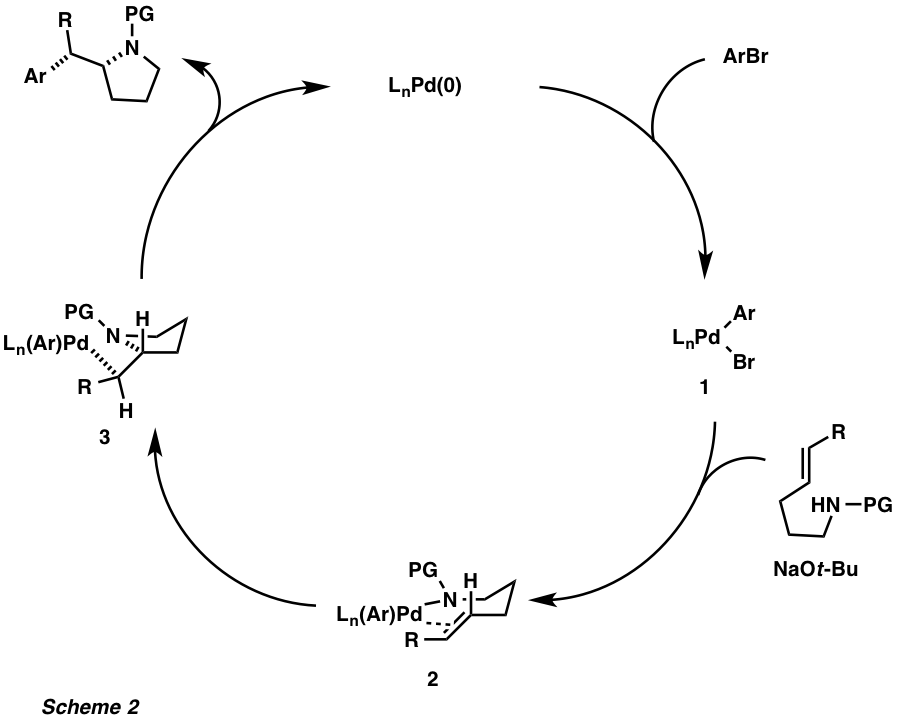

The reaction is initiated by oxidative addition of the aryl bromide to Pd(0) (1), proceeded by the formation of the key intermediate palladium(aryl)amido complex 2, which then undergoes intramolecular syn-migratory insertion of the alkene into the Pd-N bond to yield 3 to generate the product via reductive elimination (Scheme 2).

=== Buchwald ligands ===
JohnPhos

During Wolfe’s graduate career at MIT with Professor Stephen L. Buchwald, he was involved in developing dialkylbiaryl phosphine ligands (now referred to as "Buchwald ligands") that are highly efficient in palladium-catalyzed reactions. One of these ligands – JohnPhos - was named after him and is now commercially available.

In general, JohnPhos is a ligand for the Buchwald-Hartwig Cross Coupling reaction, C-X bond formation, the Heck reaction and Suzuki-Miyaura coupling. JohnPhos is a particularly effective ligand for the palladium-catalyzed amination of aryl chlorides, bromides, and triflates. The ligand allows the reactions to take place at room-temperature, and performs well for a wide range of different substrate combinations at 80-110 °C, which includes chloropyridines and functionalized aryl halides and triflates. JohnPhos is particularly useful for aminations of –neutral or electron rich aryl chlorides with a wide variety of amine coupling partners. An example of the catalytic amination of an aryl chloride with N-methylaniline at room temperature is shown in Scheme 3.

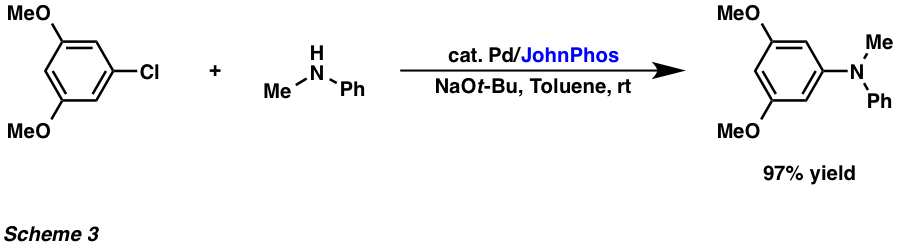
An example of the catalytic amination of an aryl chloride with N-methylaniline at room temperature.

Although the high reactivity of the ligand is not completely understood, Buchwald et al. suggest some structural factors that contribute to their effectiveness: the electron rich phosphine group may help the acceleration of the oxidative addition step, the steric bulk of the ligands may accelerate the C-N bond forming reductive elimination, and the π-system of the ortho aromatic group on the ligand may participate in an interaction with the unoccupied metal d-orbital. Another hypothesis is that the metal-arene interaction could stabilize the catalyst. The arene from the aryl halide is forced to orient perpendicularly to the N-Pd bond, which should stereoelectronically favor reductive elimination.

== Awards ==
Wolfe has received many honors and awards, including the following:

- John Dewey Award, 2012
- LSA Excellence in Education Award, 2012
- Tetrahedron Most Cited Paper 2006-2009 Award, 2009
- University of Michigan Chemistry Faculty Teaching Award, 2009
- GlaxoSmithKline Chemistry Scholar Award, 2008-2009
- William R. Roush Junior Faculty Development Award, 2006
- Camille Dreyfus Teacher-Scholar Award, 2006
- Eli Lilly Grantee Award, 2005
- Amgen Young Investigator’s Award, 2004
- 3M Untenured Faculty Award, 2003-2005
- Lilly Unrestricted Research Award, 2002
- Research Corporation Innovation Award, 2002
- Dreyfus New Faculty Award, 2002
