= Dialkylbiaryl phosphine ligands =

Phosphorus-containing ligands

Dialkylbiaryl phosphine ligands are phosphine ligands that are used in homogeneous catalysis. They have proved useful in Buchwald-Hartwig amination and etherification reactions as well as Negishi cross-coupling, Suzuki-Miyaura cross-coupling, and related reactions. In addition to these Pd-based processes, their use has also been extended to transformations catalyzed by nickel, gold, silver, copper, rhodium, and ruthenium, among other transition metals.

== History ==
Dialkylbiaryl phosphine ligands were first described by Stephen L. Buchwald in 1998 for applications in palladium-catalyzed coupling reactions to form carbon-nitrogen and carbon-carbon bonds. Before their development, use of first- or second-generation phosphine ligands for Pd-catalyzed C-N bond-forming cross-coupling (e.g., tris(o-tolyl)phosphine and BINAP, respectively) necessitated harsh conditions, and the scope of the transformation was severely limited. The Suzuki-Miyaura and Negishi cross-coupling reactions were typically performed with Pd(PPh_{3})_{4} as catalyst and were mostly limited to aryl bromides and iodides at elevated temperatures, while the widely available aryl chlorides were unreactive. Dialkylbiaryl phosphine ligands are sometimes referred to as the "Buchwald ligands."

== General features ==
One pot synthesis of dialkylbiaryl phosphine ligands

Dialkylbiaryl phosphine ligands are air-stable solids. Many are available commercially. They often can be synthesized in from inexpensive starting materials. One pot protocols have been conducted on >10 kilograms (22 lb) scales.

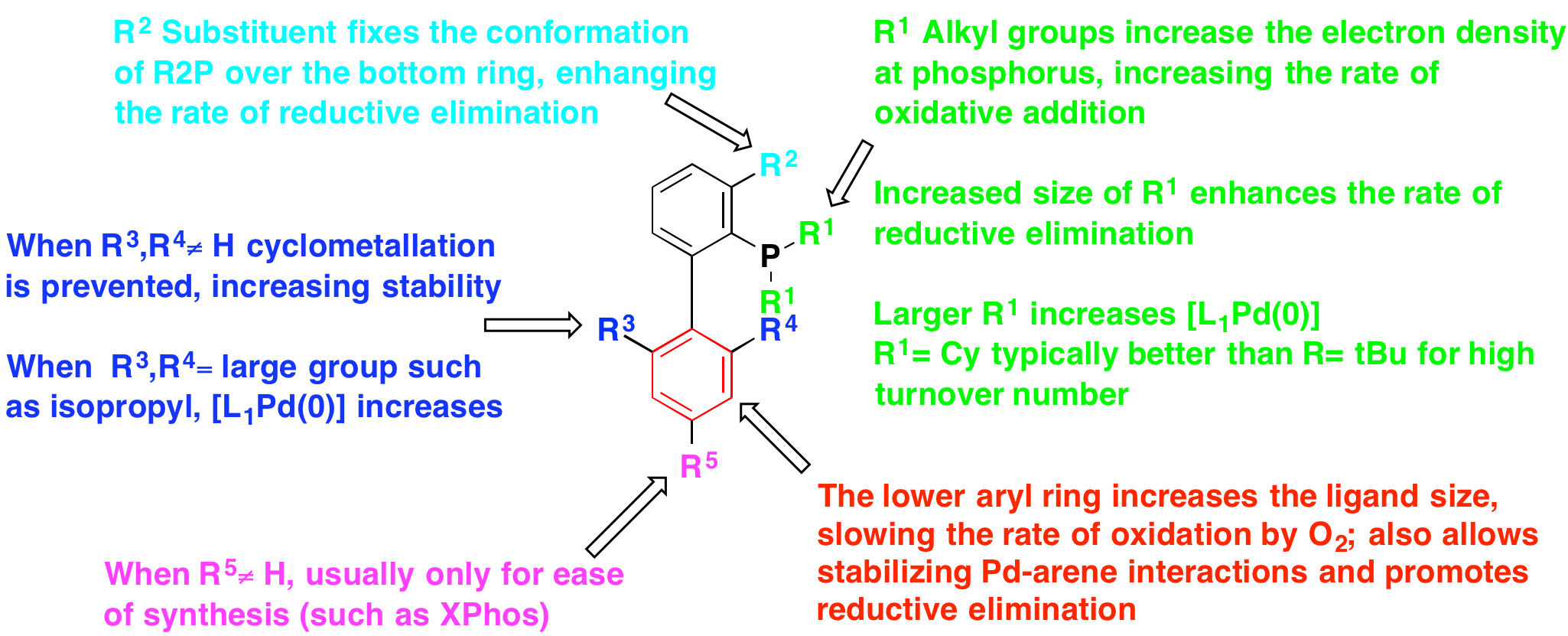
Structural features of the dialkylbiarylphosphines and their impact on the efficacy of catalysts using these ligands

Their enhanced catalytic activity over other ligands in palladium-catalyzed coupling reactions have been attributed to their electron-richness, steric bulk, and some special structural features. In particular, cyclohexyl, t-butyl, and adamantyl groups on the phosphorus are used for this purpose as bulky, electron-donating substituents. The lower ring of the biphenyl system, ortho to the phosphino group, is also a key structural feature. Numerous crystallographic studies have indicated that it behaves as a hemilabile ligand and is believed to play a role in stabilizing the highly reactive, formally 12-electron L–Pd^{0} intermediate during the catalytic cycle. 2,6-Substitution on the lower ring minimizes catalyst decomposition via Pd-mediated C-H activation of these positions. Extensive experimentation by the Buchwald group has shown that further minor changes to the structure of these ligands can dramatically alter their catalytic activity in cross coupling reactions with different substrates. This has led to the evolution of multiple ligands that are tailored for specific transformations. By providing a means of generating the postulated catalytically active L–Pd^{0} species under mild conditions (room temperature or lower in many cases), the development of several generations of base-activated, cyclopalladated precatalysts have further broadened the applicability of the ligands and simplified their use.

== Common Dialkylbiaryl phosphine ligands ==
=== DavePhos ===
DavePhos

DavePhos, the first reported dialkylbiaryl phosphine ligand, was initially used in Pd-catalyzed Suzuki-Miyaura cross-coupling reactions as well as Buchwald-Hartwig aminations. Complexes of this ligand also catalyze a wide array of reactions, including the arylation of ketones and esters, borylation of aryl chlorides, and the arylation of indoles.

Many modified versions of DavePhos have been synthesized. t-BuDavePhos has been shown to be an even more reactive variant of DavePhos in the room temperature Suzuki-Miyaura coupling of aryl bromides and chlorides. The biphenyl equivalent (PhDavePhos) is also available.

=== JohnPhos ===
JohnPhos

Pd complexes of JohnPhos catalyze Suzuki-Miyaura reactions with aryl bromides and chlorides. It tolerates hindered substrates and operates at room temperature with low catalyst loading. This ligand has been utilized in multiple reactions including the amination of a range of aryl halides and triflates as well as the arylation of thiophenes.

=== MePhos ===
MePhos

Like DavePhos and JohnPhos, MePhos complexes of Pd catalyze the Suzuki-Miyaura coupling. It can also form the active catalyst in the formation of aryl ketones. Variants of this ligand, including t-BuMePhos, are also commercially available.

The Pd_{2}(dba)_{3}/MePhos catalytic system has been applied to late stage Suzuki cross couplings. This reaction has been conducted on a kilogram (2.2 lbs)scale, and no specific palladium-removal treatment was required as the excess imidazole present in the final amide coupling step coordinated to the Pd and generated a removable byproduct.

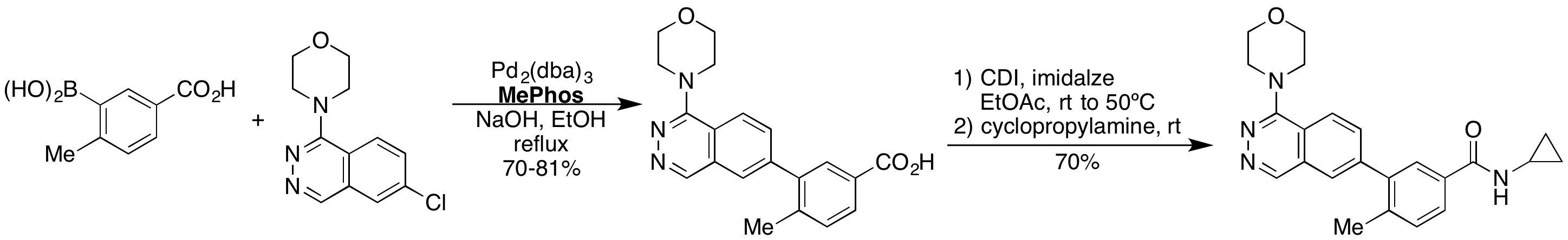
Amgen kilogram-acale aynthesis of p38 MAP kinase inhibitor candidate

=== XPhos ===
XPhos

Pd complexes of XPhos catalyze the amination and amidation of arylsulfonates and aryl halides. XPhos has also been used in the Pd-catalyzed borylation of aryl and heteroaryl chlorides

Modified versions of XPhos, he more hindered t-BuXPhos and Me4tButylXPhos, have been employed in the formation of diaryl ethers. Incorporation of a sulfonate group at the 4-position allows this ligand to be used for Sonogashira couplings in aqueous biphasic solvents.

=== SPhos ===
SPhos

Pd complexes of SPhos catalyze Suzuki-Miyaura coupling reactions. This ligand enables the cross-coupling of heteroaryl, electron-rich and electron-poor aryl, and vinylboronic acids with a variety of aryl and heteroaryl halides under mild reaction conditions. SPhos has also been used in the Pd-catalyzed borylation of aryl and heteroaryl chlorides.

3-Sulfonate variants of SPhos have been used in Suzuki-Miyaura couplings in aqueous media. SPhos was used in the 8 step total synthesis of (±)-geigerin.

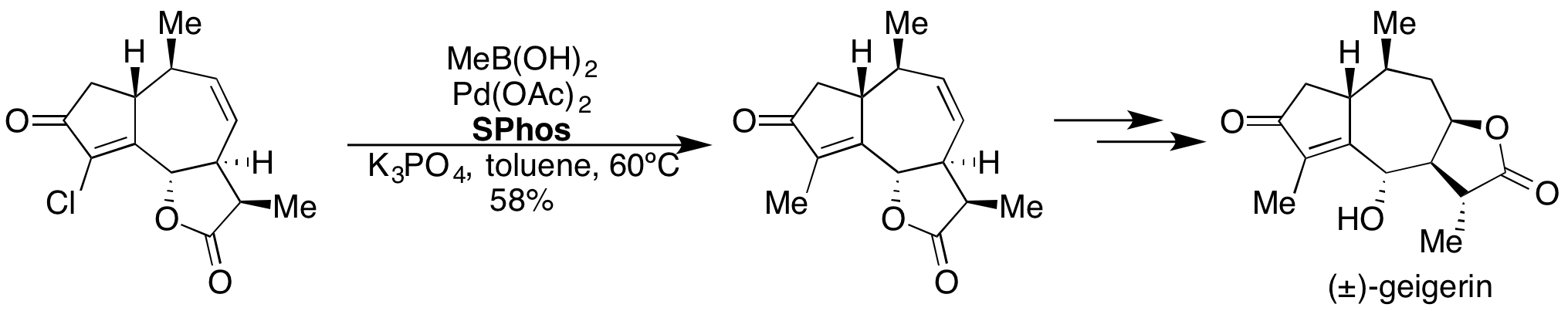
Synthesis of geigerin through Suzuki-Miyaura Coupling

=== RuPhos ===
RuPhos

Pd complexes of RuPhos catalyze Negishi coupling of organozincs with aryl halides. This ligands tolerates hindered substrates as well as a wide range of functional groups. Its complexes also catalyze the trifluoromethylation of aryl chlorides and aminations of aryl halides.

=== BrettPhos ===
BrettPhos

Pd complexes of BrettPhos catalyze the amination of aryl mesylates and aryl halides. Pd-BrettPhos complexes catalyze the coupling of weak nucleophiles with aryl halides. Such catalysts are selective for the monoarylation of primary amines. Other applications of BrettPhos in catalysis include trifluoromethylation of aryl chlorides, the formation of aryl trifluoromethyl sulfides, and Suzuki-Miyaura cross-couplings.

Pd- t-BuBrettPhos complexes catalyze the conversion of aryl triflates and aryl bromides to aryl fluorides as well as the synthesis of aromatic nitro compounds. The bulky AdBrettPhos can be used in the amidation of five-membered heterocyclic halides that contain multiple heteroatoms (such as haloimidazoles and halopyrazoles).

=== CPhos ===
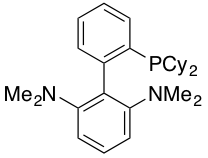
CPhos

Pd complexes of CPhos catalyze the synthesis of 3-cyclopentylindole derivatives, dihydrobenzofurans, and trans-bicyclic sulfamides. It has also been used to synthesize palladacycle precatalysts for Negishi coupling of secondary alkylzinc reagents with aryl halides.

=== AlPhos ===
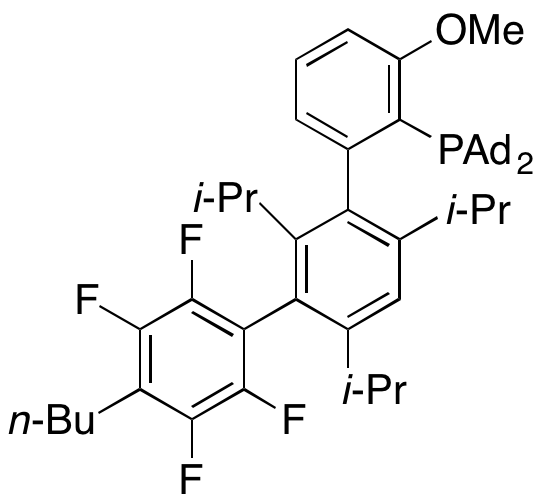
AlPhos

AlPhos allows for the mild Pd-catalyzed fluorination of aryl- and heteroaryl triflates. Reported in 2015, this ligand has been used for Buchwald-Hartwig cross-coupling reactions and synthesizing highly regioselective aryl fluorides through Pd-catalyzed fluorination of various activated aryl and heteroaryl triflates and bromides. Its palladium complexes have also been used to prepare aryl thioethers by C–S cross-coupling of thiols with aromatic electrophiles.

== Oxidative addition complex ==
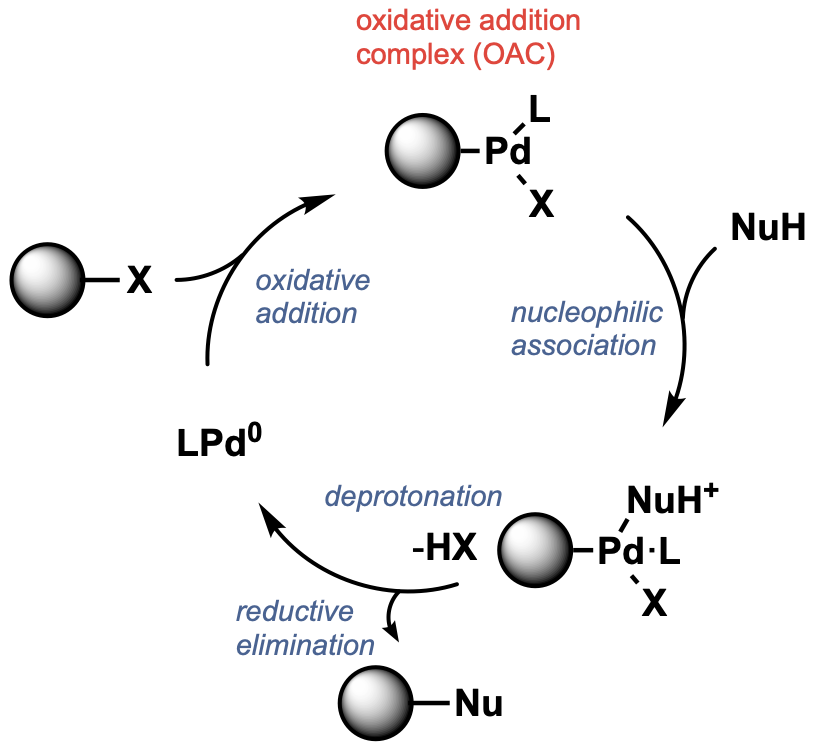

Many Pd-catalyzed cross coupling reactions involve oxidative addition to form Pd(II) derivatives, which are called oxidative addition complexes (OAC). The resulting L–Pd^{II}(Ar)X OAC is electrophilic such that it reacts with a nucleophile and forms C–C and C–heteroatom bonds, after reductive elimination. Such Pd^{II}OACs have been used as precatalysts. OACs exhibit stability, which allows reactions to proceed under mild conditions. They have been applied to bioconjugation. For example, RuPhos and SPhos have been used as ligands for Pd-mediated cysteine arylation, and the use of BrettPhos and t-BuBrettPhos allow arylation of lysine.

== See also ==
- Coupling reaction
- Organometallic chemistry
- Ligand
- Bioconjugation: Transition Metal-Mediated Bioconjugation Reactions
