= Tris(dibenzylideneacetone)dipalladium(0) =

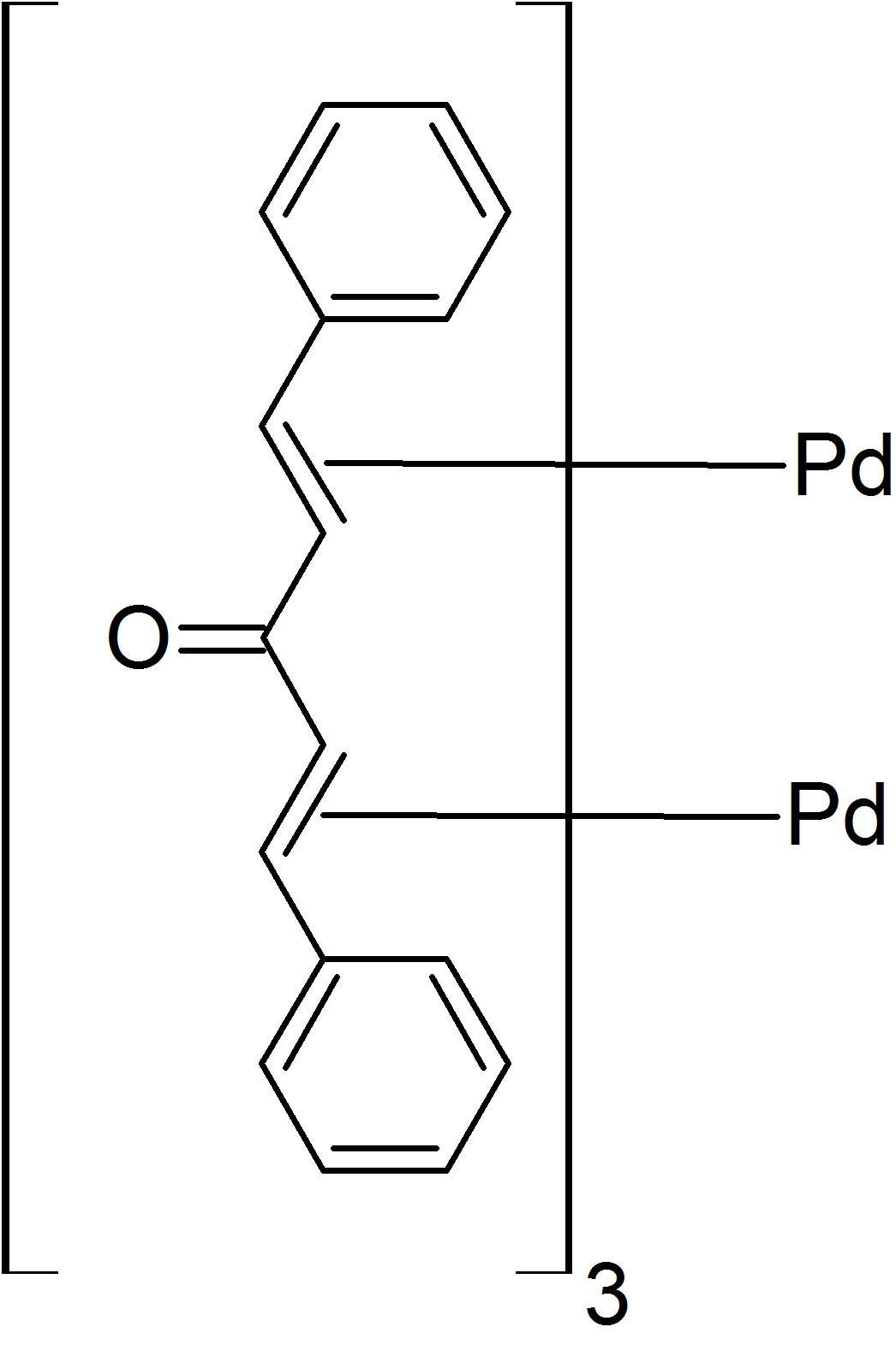

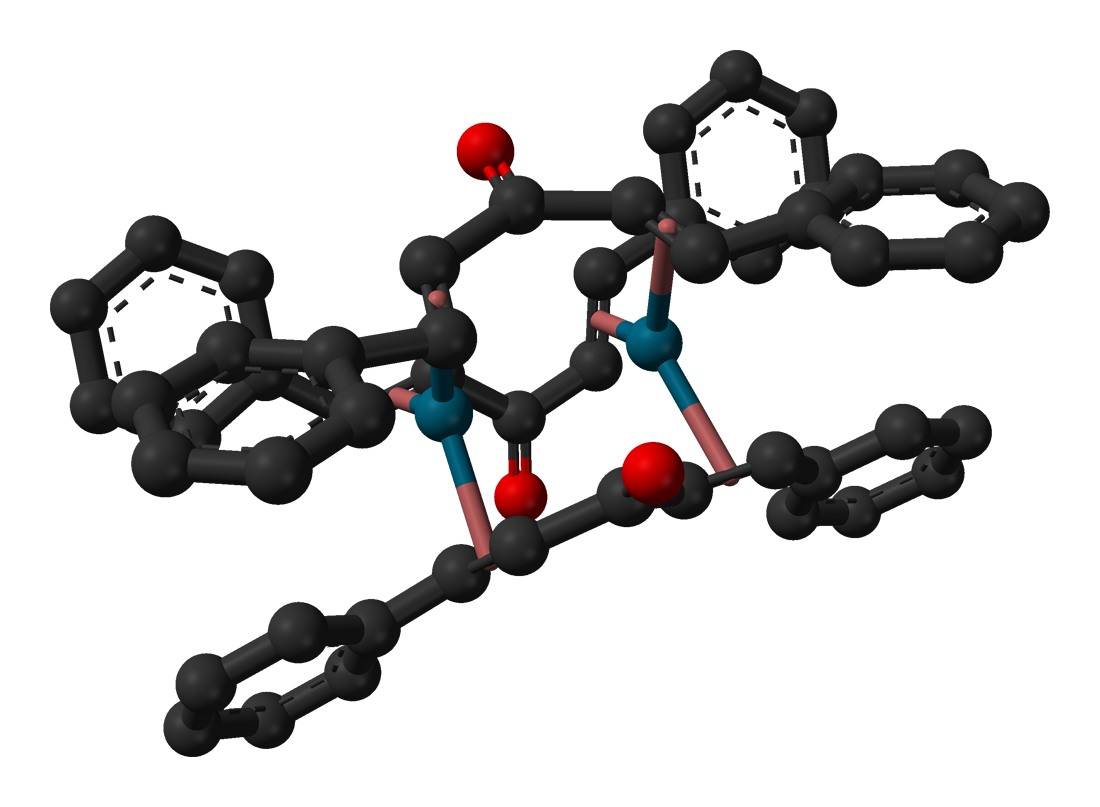

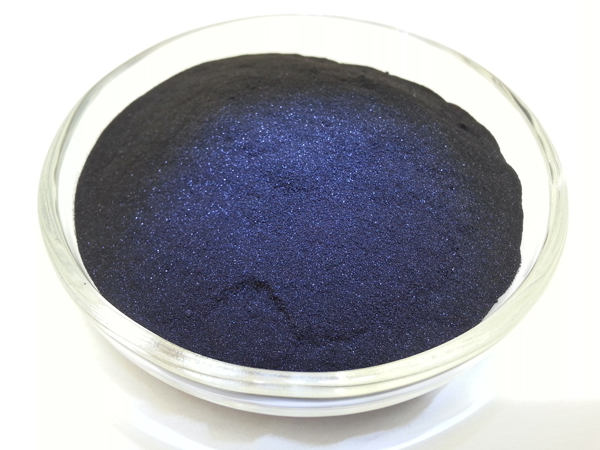

Names
- IUPAC name Tris(dibenzylideneacetone)dipalladium
- Other names Pd_{2}(dba)_{3}

Identifiers
CAS Number	51364-51-3
3D model (JSmol)	Interactive image
ChemSpider	7987319
ECHA InfoCard	100.122.794
EC Number	610-654-4
PubChem CID	9811564
UNII	9QT8U6472D
- InChI: InChI=1S/3C17H14O.2Pd/c3*18-17(13-11-15-7-3-1-4-8-15)14-12-16-9-5-2-6-10-16;;/h3*1-14H;;/b3*13-11+,14-12+;; Key: CYPYTURSJDMMMP-WVCUSYJESA-N
- SMILES: C1=CC=C(C=C1)/C=C/C(=O)/C=C/C2=CC=CC=C2.C1=CC=C(C=C1)/C=C/C(=O)/C=C/C2=CC=CC=C2.C1=CC=C(C=C1)/C=C/C(=O)/C=C/C2=CC=CC=C2.[Pd].[Pd]

Properties
Chemical formula	C_{51}H_{42}O_{3}Pd_{2}
Molar mass	915.73 g·mol^{−1}
Melting point	152 to 155 °C (306 to 311 °F; 425 to 428 K)

Hazards
- GHS labelling
Pictograms	(GHS07: Exclamation mark) (GHS09: Environmental hazard)
Signal word	Warning
Hazard statements	H315, H317, H319, H335, H411
Precautionary statements	P261, P264, P264+P265, P271, P272, P273, P280, P302+P352, P304+P340, P305+P351+P338, P319, P321, P333+P317, P337+P317, P362+P364, P391, P403+P233, P405, P501
- Except where otherwise noted, data are given for materials in their standard state (at 25 °C [77 °F], 100 kPa). verify (what is ?) Infobox references

Tris(dibenzylideneacetone)dipalladium(0) or [Pd_{2}(dba)_{3}] is an organopalladium compound. The compound is a complex of palladium(0) with dibenzylideneacetone (dba). It is a dark-purple/brown solid, which is modestly soluble in organic solvents. Because the dba ligands are easily displaced, the complex is used as a homogeneous catalyst in organic synthesis.

== Preparation and structure ==
First reported in 1970, it is prepared from dibenzylideneacetone and sodium tetrachloropalladate. Because it is commonly recrystallized from chloroform, the complex is often supplied as the adduct [Pd_{2}(dba)_{3}·CHCl_{3}]. The purity of samples can be variable.

In [Pd_{2}(dba)_{3}], the pair of Pd atoms are separated by 320 pm but are tied together by dba units. The Pd(0) centres are bound to the alkene parts of the dba ligands.

== Applications ==
[Pd_{2}(dba)_{3}] is used as a source of soluble Pd(0), in particular as a catalyst for various coupling reactions. Examples of reactions using this reagent are the Negishi coupling, Suzuki coupling, Carroll rearrangement, and Trost asymmetric allylic alkylation, as well as Buchwald–Hartwig amination.

Related Pd(0) complexes are [Pd(dba)_{2}] and tetrakis(triphenylphosphine)palladium(0).
