= XPhos =

Names
- Preferred IUPAC name Dicyclohexyl[2′,4′,6′-tris(propan-2-yl)[1,1′-biphenyl]-2-yl]phosphane
- Other names XPhos

Identifiers
| CAS Number | 564483-18-7 |
| 3D model (JSmol) | Interactive image |
| ChemSpider | 9330902 |
| ECHA InfoCard | 100.123.428 |
| PubChem CID | 11155794 |
| UNII | R271FU23T8 |
| CompTox Dashboard (EPA) | DTXSID50457126 |
- InChI: InChI=1S/C33H49P/c1-23(2)26-21-30(24(3)4)33(31(22-26)25(5)6)29-19-13-14-20-32(29)34(27-15-9-7-10-16-27)28-17-11-8-12-18-28/h13-14,19-25,27-28H,7-12,15-18H2,1-6H3 Key: UGOMMVLRQDMAQQ-UHFFFAOYSA-N; InChI=1/C33H49P/c1-23(2)26-21-30(24(3)4)33(31(22-26)25(5)6)29-19-13-14-20-32(29)34(27-15-9-7-10-16-27)28-17-11-8-12-18-28/h13-14,19-25,27-28H,7-12,15-18H2,1-6H3 Key: UGOMMVLRQDMAQQ-UHFFFAOYAR
- SMILES: P(c2ccccc2c1c(cc(cc1C(C)C)C(C)C)C(C)C)(C3CCCCC3)C4CCCCC4

Properties
| Chemical formula | C_{33}H_{49}P |
| Molar mass | 476.72 |
| Appearance | colorless solid |
| Melting point | 187 to 190 °C (369 to 374 °F; 460 to 463 K) |
| Solubility in water | organic solvents |
- Except where otherwise noted, data are given for materials in their standard state (at 25 °C [77 °F], 100 kPa). verify (what is ?) Infobox references

XPhos is a phosphine ligand derived from biphenyl. Its palladium complexes exhibit high activity for Buchwald-Hartwig amination reactions involving aryl chlorides and aryl tosylates. Both palladium and copper complexes of the compound exhibit high activity for the coupling of aryl halides and aryl tosylates with various amides. It is also an efficient ligand for several commonly used C–C bond-forming cross-coupling reactions, including the Negishi, Suzuki, and the copper-free Sonogashira coupling reactions. It is especially efficient and general when employed as a (2-aminobiphenyl)-cyclometalated palladium mesylate precatalyst complex (Buchwald's third generation precatalyst system), XPhos-G3-Pd, which is commercially available and stable to bench storage. The ligand itself also has convenient handling characteristics as a crystalline, air-stable solid.

== Structure ==
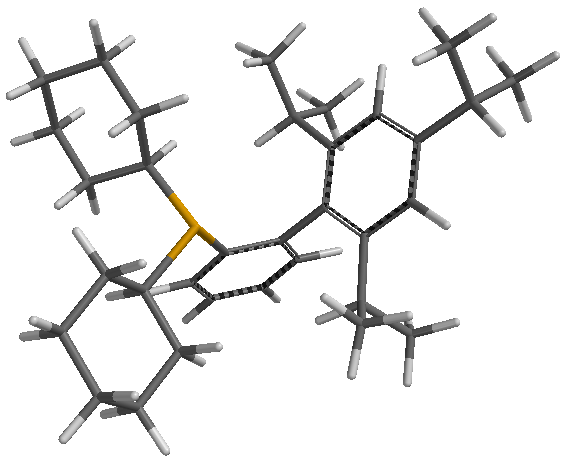
One view of the molecule's structure.

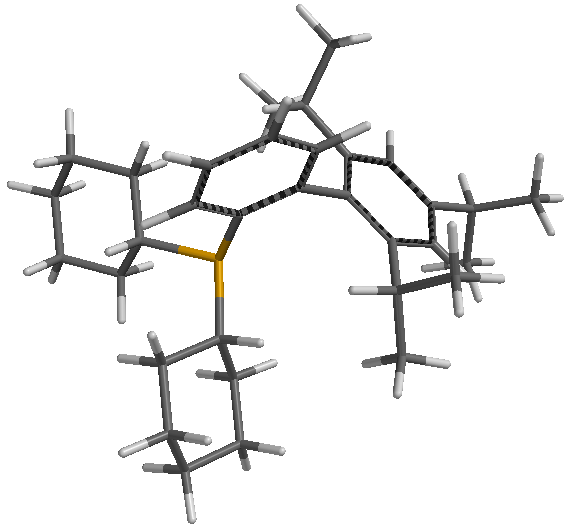
Another view of the molecule's structure.

== See also ==
- SPhos
- CPhos
- Dialkylbiaryl phosphine ligands
- Buchwald-Hartwig reaction
