= CPhos =

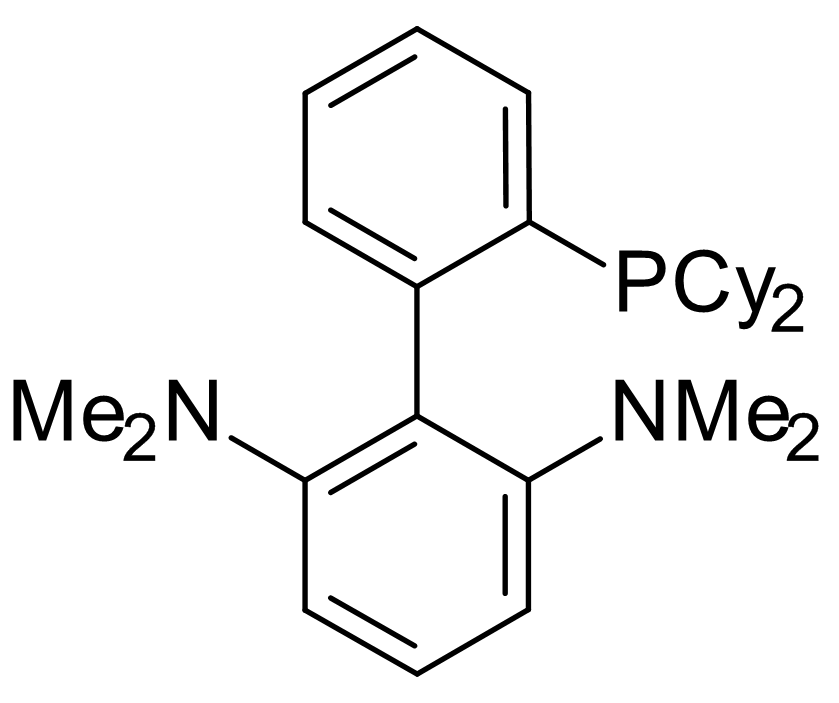

Names
- Preferred IUPAC name 2′-(Dicyclohexylphosphanyl)-N^{2},N^{2},N^{6},N^{6}-tetramethyl[1,1′-biphenyl]-2,6-diamine
- Other names CPhos

Identifiers
CAS Number	1160556-64-8
3D model (JSmol)	Interactive image
ChemSpider	29783668
PubChem CID	44156169
UNII	9D5DWS5PBX
CompTox Dashboard (EPA)	DTXSID301045581
- InChI: InChI=1S/C28H41N2P/c1-29(2)25-19-13-20-26(30(3)4)28(25)24-18-11-12-21-27(24)31(22-14-7-5-8-15-22)23-16-9-6-10-17-23/h11-13,18-23H,5-10,14-17H2,1-4H3 Key: DRNAQRXLOSUHBQ-UHFFFAOYSA-N; InChI=1/C28H41N2P/c1-29(2)25-19-13-20-26(30(3)4)28(25)24-18-11-12-21-27(24)31(22-14-7-5-8-15-22)23-16-9-6-10-17-23/h11-13,18-23H,5-10,14-17H2,1-4H3 Key: DRNAQRXLOSUHBQ-UHFFFAOYAL
- SMILES: CN(C)C1=C(C(=CC=C1)N(C)C)C2=CC=CC=C2P(C3CCCCC3)C4CCCCC4

Properties
Chemical formula	C_{28}H_{41}N_{2}P
Molar mass	436.61
Appearance	white solid
Melting point	111 to 113 °C (232 to 235 °F; 384 to 386 K)
Solubility in water	organic solvents
- Except where otherwise noted, data are given for materials in their standard state (at 25 °C [77 °F], 100 kPa). Infobox references

CPhos is a phosphine ligand derived from biphenyl. It is a white solid that is soluble in organic solvents.

Its palladium complexes exhibit high activity for Negishi coupling reactions involving aryl bromides, chlorides and triflates. CPhos mediated reactions performed with secondary (sp^{3}) alkylzinc halides often give excellent yields, with low conversion to the frequently encountered primary substituted side products.

== Utility in Negishi Coupling ==
A simplified scheme showing the reaction course of isopropylzinc bromide with an aryl halide is shown below. Processes leading to byproduct formation are highlighted in red.

Oxidative addition (1) of the aryl halide to the palladium-ligand complex followed by transmetalation (2) gives intermediate B which can undergo reductive elimination (3) to afford the desired isopropyl arene C. However, intermediate B can also undergo β-hydride elimination (4) to afford D, which can either reductively eliminate (3’) to afford de-halogenated product G, or undergo insertion (5) leading to the formation of E. Once formed, E may also undergo reductive elimination (3’’) to afford the n-propyl by-product F.

CPhos minimises the conversion to undesired products F & G by increasing the rate of the reductive elimination of B, relative to the rate of β-hydride elimination.

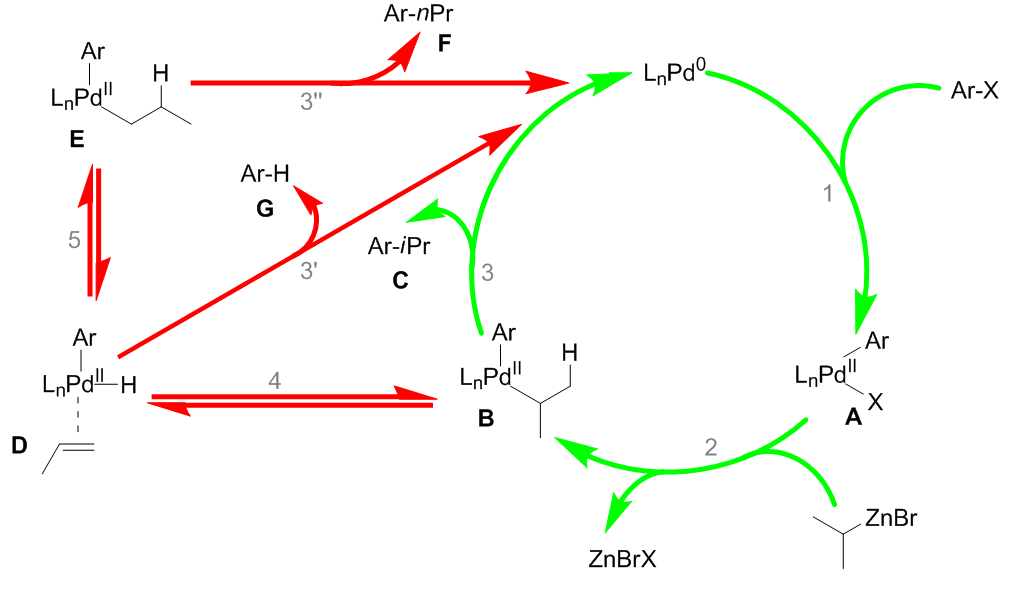
The mechanism of the Negishi coupling

== See also ==
- Negishi coupling
- XPhos
- SPhos
- Dialkylbiaryl phosphine ligands
