= Seble Wagaw =

American organic chemist

Seble-Hiwot Wagaw is an American organic chemist who is a senior leader at AbbVie pharmaceuticals outside Chicago, IL.

== Background and Education ==
Wagaw was born in Addis Ababa, Ethiopia and emigrated to the United States in 1974. Her father, Teshome Gebremichael Wagaw, was a faculty member at the University of Michigan for 28 years, and her mother is Tsehai Wolde-Tsadik. She is one of three children, with an older brother and sister. She received her Bachelor's and MS degrees in Chemistry from the University of Michigan in 1994, and a Ph.D. in organic chemistry with Stephen L. Buchwald at the Massachusetts Institute of Technology in 1999. Her research in the Buchwald lab utilized chiral complexes of Palladium to forge new carbon-nitrogen bonds on Aryl rings.

== Career ==
As a Senior Director for process research and R&D at Abbott Laboratories (later AbbVie) for her entire career, Wagaw has published research on enantiomerically enriched lead molecules using Pybox ligands. She has led exploration into new technologies for her process group, including explorations of flow chemistry and commercial-scale electrochemistry.

She is on the advisory board for Asymchem and co-founded the Cross-industry Women's chemical process group.

== Awards and recognition ==
- 1995 - Ford Foundation pre-doctoral fellowship, MIT
- 2004 - Women of Color Research investigators
- 2013 - American Chemical Society WCC Rising Stars Award
