= Stephen L. Buchwald =

American chemist

- Born: 1955 (age 70–71); Bloomington, Indiana
- Education: Brown University; Harvard University
- Awards: Wolf Prize in Chemistry (2019)
- Scientific career
- Fields: Organic chemistry, Organometallic chemistry, Catalysis
- Doctoral advisor: Jeremy R. Knowles
- Notable students: John P. Wolfe, Seble Wagaw

Stephen L. Buchwald (born 1955) is an American chemist and the Camille Dreyfus Professor of Chemistry at MIT. He is known for his involvement in the development of the Buchwald-Hartwig amination and the discovery of the dialkylbiaryl phosphine ligand family for promoting this reaction and related transformations. He was elected as a fellow of the American Academy of Arts and Sciences and as a member of the National Academy of Sciences in 2000 and 2008, respectively.

== Early life and education ==
Stephen Buchwald was born in Bloomington, Indiana. He credits his "young and dynamic" high school chemistry teacher, William Lumbley, for infecting him with his enthusiasm.

In 1977 he received his Sc.B. from Brown University where he worked with Kathlyn A. Parker and David E. Cane as well as Gilbert Stork from Columbia University. In 1982 he received his Ph.D. from Harvard University working under Jeremy R. Knowles.

== Career ==
Buchwald was a postdoctoral fellow at Caltech with Robert H. Grubbs. In 1984, he joined MIT faculty as an assistant professor of chemistry. He was promoted to associate professor in 1989 and to Professor in 1993. He was named the Camille Dreyfus Professor in 1997. He has coauthored over 435 accepted academic publications and 47 accepted patents.

He is known for his involvement in the development of the Buchwald-Hartwig amination and the discovery of the dialkylbiaryl phosphine ligand family for promoting this reaction and related transformations. He was elected as a fellow of the American Academy of Arts and Sciences and as a member of the National Academy of Sciences in 2000 and 2008, respectively. As of 2015, he served as an associate editor for the academic journal, Advanced Synthesis & Catalysis.

== Notable awards ==
Awards received by Buchwald include:

- 2005 - CAS Science Spotlight Award
- 2005 - Bristol-Myers Squibb Distinguished Achievement Award
- 2006 – American Chemical Society Award for Creative Work in Synthetic Organic Chemistry
- 2006 – Siegfried Medal Award in Chemical Methods which Impact Process Chemistry
- 2010 – Gustavus J. Esselen Award for Chemistry in the Public Interest
- 2013 – Arthur C. Cope Award
- 2014 – Ulysses Medal, University College Dublin
- 2014 – Linus Pauling Award
- 2014 – BBVA Foundation Frontiers of Knowledge Award in Basic Sciences
- 2015 – honorary doctorate, University of South Florida
- 2016 – William H. Nichols Medal
- 2019 – Wolf Prize in Chemistry
- 2019 – Roger Adams Award, American Chemical Society
- 2020 – Clarivate Citation Laureate
