= Negishi coupling =

Chemical reaction

Named after	Ei-ichi Negishi
Reaction type	Coupling reaction

Identifiers
Organic Chemistry Portal	negishi-coupling
RSC ontology ID	RXNO:0000088

The Negishi coupling is a widely employed transition metal catalyzed cross-coupling reaction. The reaction couples organic halides or triflates with organozinc compounds, forming carbon–carbon bonds (C–C) in the process. A palladium (0) species is generally utilized as the catalyst, though nickel is sometimes used. A variety of nickel catalysts in either Ni^{0} or Ni^{II} oxidation state can be employed in Negishi cross couplings such as Ni(PPh_{3})_{4}, Ni(acac)_{2}, Ni(COD)_{2} etc.

$$\begin{matrix} {}\\
{\color{Red}\ce R}{-}{\color{Blue}\ce X} + {\color{Green}\ce R'}{-}\ce{Zn}{\color{Magenta}\ce X'} \ \ce{->[\ce{PdL}_n \text{ or } \ce{NiL}_n]} \ {\color{Red}\ce R}{-}{\color{Green}\ce R'}
\end{matrix}$$

- The leaving group X is usually chloride, bromide, or iodide, but triflate and acetyloxy groups are feasible as well. X = Cl usually leads to slow reactions.
- The organic residue R = alkenyl, aryl, allyl, alkynyl or propargyl.
- The halide X′ in the organozinc compound can be chloride, bromine or iodine and the organic residue R′ is alkenyl, aryl, allyl, alkyl, benzyl, homoallyl, and homopropargyl.
- The metal M in the catalyst is nickel or palladium
- The ligand L in the catalyst can be triphenylphosphine, dppe, BINAP, chiraphos or XPhos.

Palladium catalysts in general have higher chemical yields and higher functional group tolerance.

The Negishi coupling finds common use in the field of total synthesis as a method for selectively forming C-C bonds between complex synthetic intermediates. The reaction allows for the coupling of sp^{3}, sp^{2}, and sp carbon atoms, (see orbital hybridization) which make it somewhat unusual among the palladium-catalyzed coupling reactions. Organozincs are moisture and air sensitive, so the Negishi coupling must be performed in an oxygen and water free environment, a fact that has hindered its use relative to other cross-coupling reactions that require less robust conditions (i.e. Suzuki reaction). However, organozincs are more reactive than both organostannanes and organoborates which correlates to faster reaction times.

The reaction is named after Ei-ichi Negishi who was a co-recipient of the 2010 Nobel Prize in Chemistry for the discovery and development of this reaction.

Negishi and coworkers originally investigated the cross-coupling of organoaluminum reagents in 1976 initially employing Ni and Pd as the transition metal catalysts, but noted that Ni resulted in the decay of stereospecifity whereas Pd did not. Transitioning from organoaluminum species to organozinc compounds Negishi and coworkers reported the use of Pd complexes in organozinc coupling reactions and carried out methods studies, eventually developing the reaction conditions into those commonly utilized today. Alongside Richard F. Heck and Akira Suzuki, El-ichi Negishi was a co-recipient of the Nobel Prize in Chemistry in 2010, for his work on "palladium-catalyzed cross couplings in organic synthesis".

== Reaction mechanism ==
The reaction mechanism is thought to proceed via a standard Pd catalyzed cross-coupling pathway, starting with a Pd(0) species, which is oxidized to Pd(II) in an oxidative addition step involving the organohalide species. This step proceeds with aryl, vinyl, alkynyl, and acyl halides, acetates, or triflates, with substrates following standard oxidative addition relative rates (I>OTf>Br≫Cl).

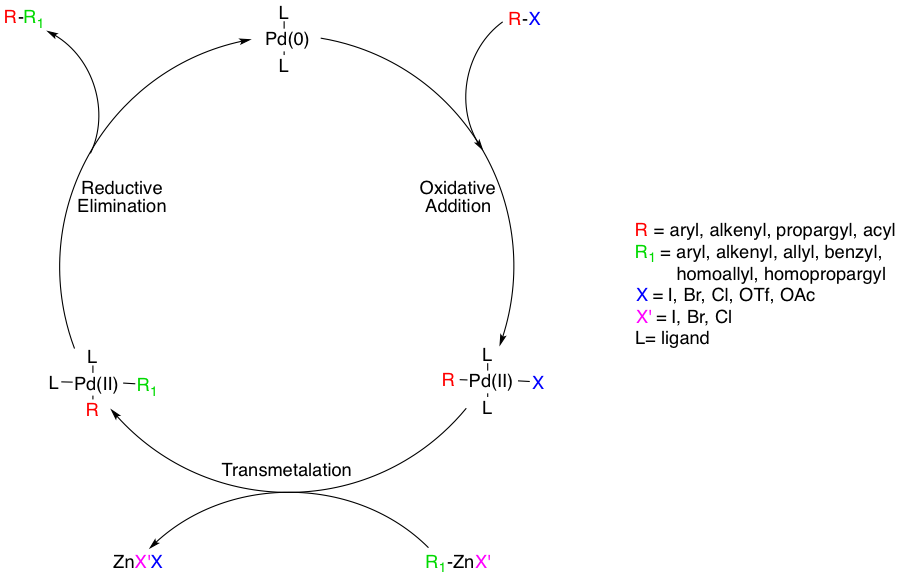

The actual mechanism of oxidative addition is unresolved, though there are two likely pathways. One pathway is thought to proceed via an S_{N}2 like mechanism resulting in inverted stereochemistry. The other pathway proceeds via concerted addition and retains stereochemistry.

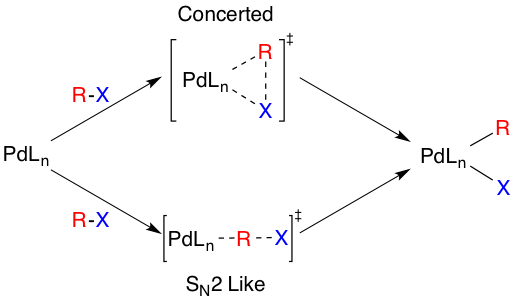
Mechanisms of oxidative addition

Though the additions are cis- the Pd(II) complex rapidly isomerizes to the trans- complex.

Next, the transmetalation step occurs where the organozinc reagent exchanges its organic substituent with the halide in the Pd(II) complex, generating the trans- Pd(II) complex and a zinc halide salt. The organozinc substrate can be aryl, vinyl, allyl, benzyl, homoallyl, or homopropargyl. Transmetalation is usually rate limiting and a complete mechanistic understanding of this step has not yet been reached though several studies have shed light on this process. Alkylzinc species form higher-order zincate species prior to transmetalation whereas arylzinc species do not. ZnXR and ZnR_{2} can both be used as reactive reagents, and Zn is known to prefer four coordinate complexes, which means solvent coordinated Zn complexes, such as ZnXR(solvent)_{2} cannot be ruled out a priori. Studies indicate competing equilibriums exist between cis- and trans- bis alkyl organopalladium complexes, but that the only productive intermediate is the cis complex.

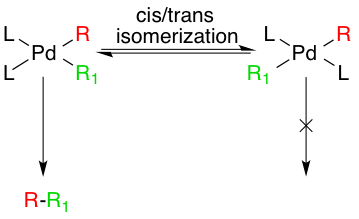
Generation of active species via cis/trans isomerism

The last step in the catalytic pathway of the Negishi coupling is reductive elimination, which is thought to proceed via a three coordinate transition state, yielding the coupled organic product and regenerating the Pd(0) catalyst. For this step to occur, the aforementioned cis- alkyl organopalladium complex must be formed.

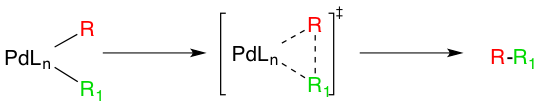
Mechanism of reductive elimination

Both organozinc halides and diorganozinc compounds can be used as starting materials. In one model system it was found that in the transmetalation step the former give the cis-adduct R-Pd-R′ resulting in fast reductive elimination to product while the latter gives the trans-adduct which has to go through a slow trans-cis isomerization first.

A common side reaction is homocoupling. In one Negishi model system the formation of homocoupling was found to be the result of a second transmetalation reaction between the diarylmetal intermediate and arylmetal halide:

Ar–Pd–Ar′ + Ar′–Zn–X → Ar′–Pd–Ar′ + Ar–Zn–X
Ar′–Pd–Ar′ → Ar′–Ar′ + Pd(0) (homocoupling)
Ar–Zn–X + H_{2}O → Ar–H + HO–Zn–X (reaction accompanied by dehalogenation)

Nickel catalyzed systems can operate under different mechanisms depending on the coupling partners. Unlike palladium systems which involve only Pd^{0} or Pd^{II}, nickel catalyzed systems can involve nickel of different oxidation states. Both systems are similar in that they involve similar elementary steps: oxidative addition, transmetalation, and reductive elimination. Both systems also have to address issues of β-hydride elimination and difficult oxidative addition of alkyl electrophiles.

For unactivated alkyl electrophiles, one possible mechanism is a transmetalation first mechanism. In this mechanism, the alkyl zinc species would first transmetalate with the nickel catalyst. Then the nickel would abstract the halide from the alkyl halide resulting in the alkyl radical and oxidation of nickel after addition of the radical.

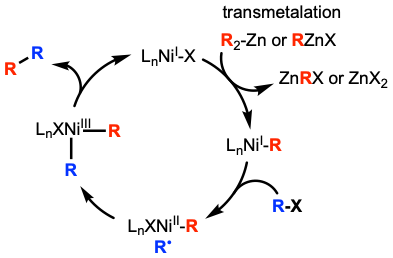

One important factor when contemplating the mechanism of a nickel catalyzed cross coupling is that reductive elimination is facile from Ni^{III} species, but very difficult from Ni^{II} species Kochi and Morrell provided evidence for this by isolating Ni^{II} complex Ni(PEt_{3})_{2}(Me)(o-tolyl), which did not undergo reductive elimination quickly enough to be involved in this elementary step.

== Scope ==
The Negishi coupling has been applied the following illustrative syntheses:

- unsymmetrical 2,2'-bipyridines from 2-bromopyridine with tetrakis(triphenylphosphine)palladium(0),
- biphenyl from o-tolylzinc chloride and o-iodotoluene and tetrakis(triphenylphosphine)palladium(0),
- 5,7-hexadecadiene from 1-decyne and (Z)-1-hexenyl iodide.

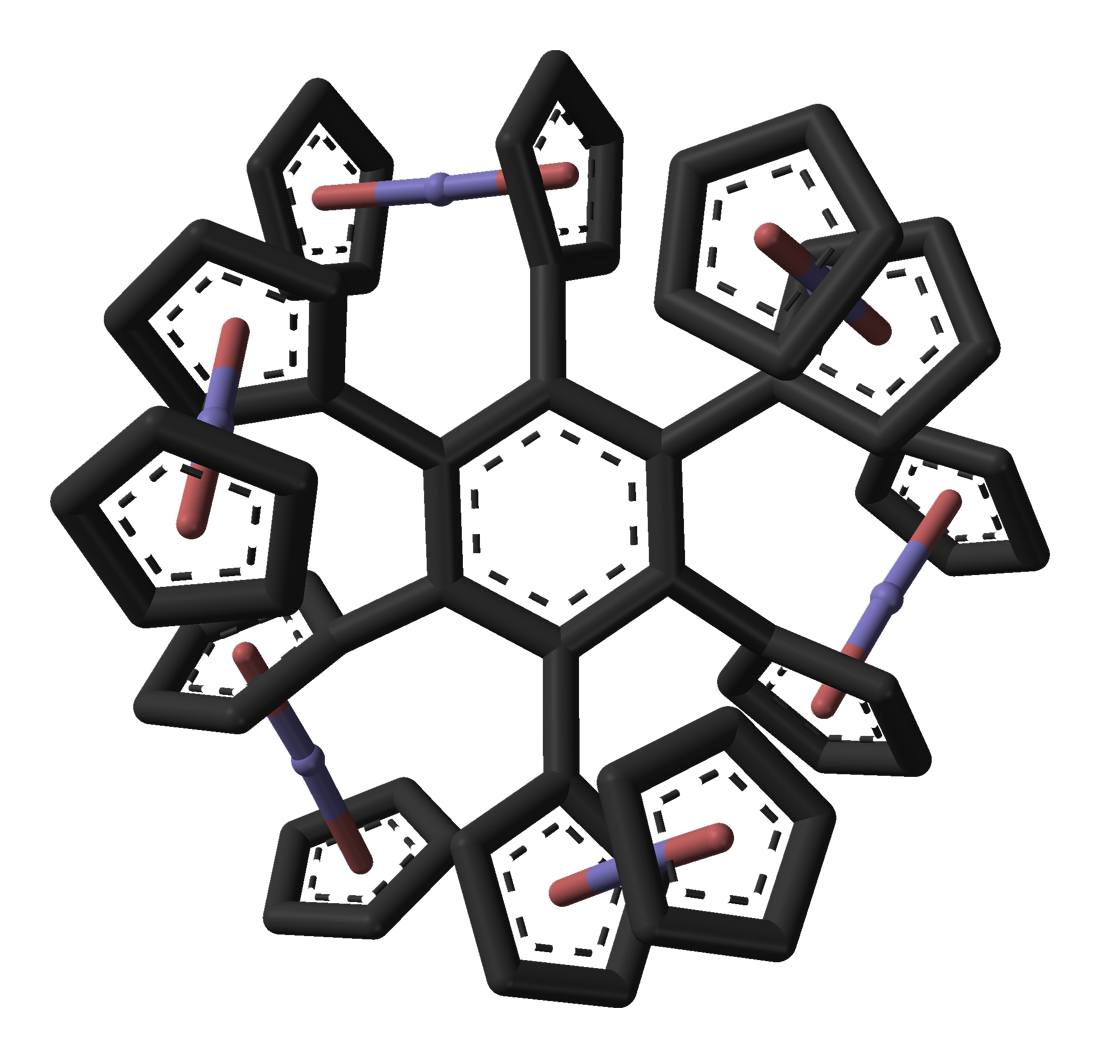
Structure of hexaferrocenylbenzene, C_{6}[(η^{5}-C_{5}H_{4})Fe(η^{5}-C_{5}H_{5})]_{6}

Negishi coupling has been applied in the synthesis of hexaferrocenylbenzene:

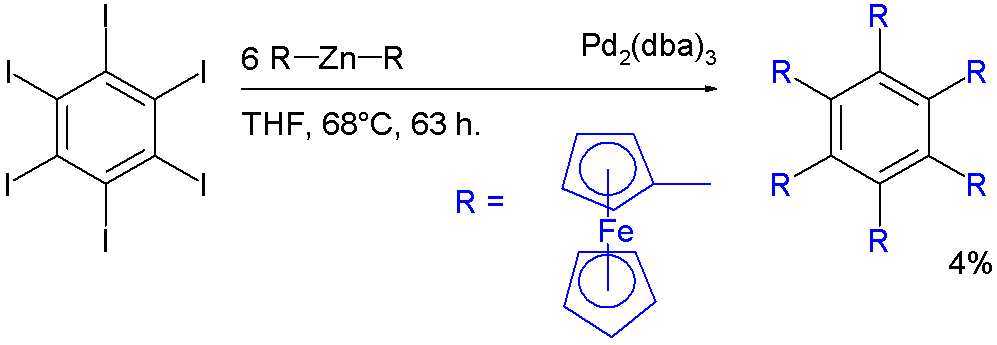

with hexaiodidobenzene, diferrocenylzinc and tris(dibenzylideneacetone)dipalladium(0) in tetrahydrofuran. The yield is only 4% signifying substantial crowding around the aryl core.

In a novel modification palladium is first oxidized by the haloketone 2-chloro-2-phenylacetophenone 1 and the resulting palladium OPdCl complex then accepts both the organozinc compound 2 and the organotin compound 3 in a double transmetalation:

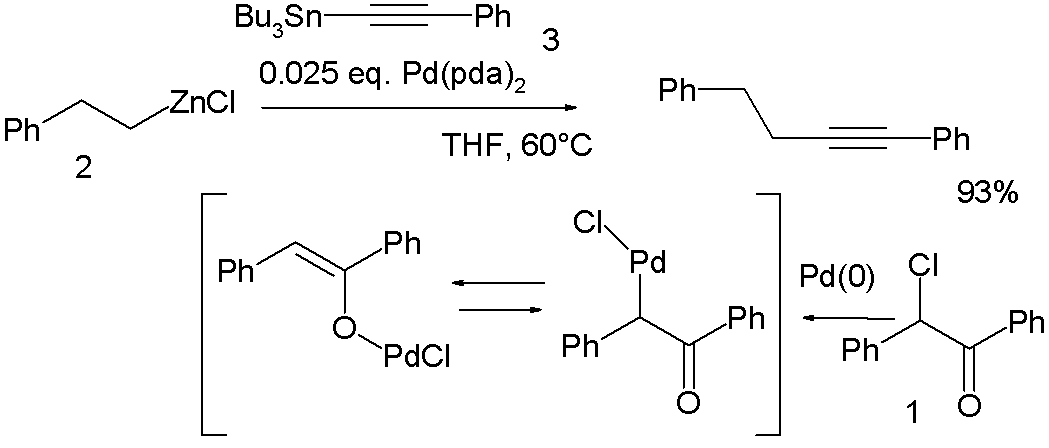

Examples of nickel catalyzed Negishi couplings include sp^{2}-sp^{2}, sp^{2}-sp^{3}, and sp^{3}-sp^{3} systems. In the system first studied by Negishi, aryl-aryl cross coupling was catalyzed by Ni(PPh_{3})_{4} generated in situ through reduction of Ni(acac)_{2} with PPh3 and (i-Bu)_{2}AlH.

$$\ce{{Ar'ZnCl} + ArX ->[\begin{matrix}{} \\ \ce{Ni(PPh3)4} (5 \text{ mol}\%)\end{matrix}][\text{THF}] Ar-Ar'}$$

Variations have also been developed to allow for the cross-coupling of aryl and alkenyl partners. In the variation developed by Knochel et al, aryl zinc bromides were reacted with vinyl triflates and vinyl halides.

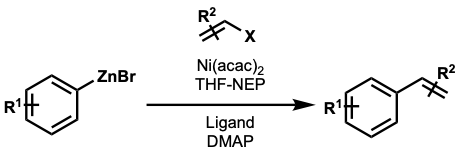

Reactions between sp^{3}-sp^{3} centers are often more difficult; however, adding an unsaturated ligand with an electron withdrawing group as a cocatalyst improved the yield in some systems. It is believed that added coordination from the unsaturated ligand favors reductive elimination over β-hydride elimination. This also works in some alkyl-aryl systems.

Several asymmetric variants exist and many utilize Pybox ligands.

=== Industrial applications ===
The Negishi coupling is not employed as frequently in industrial applications as its cousins the Suzuki reaction and Heck reaction, mostly as a result of the water and air sensitivity of the required aryl or alkyl zinc reagents. In 2003 Novartis employed a Negishi coupling in the manufacture of PDE472, a phosphodiesterase type 4D inhibitor, which was being investigated as a drug lead for the treatment of asthma. The Negishi coupling was used as an alternative to the Suzuki reaction providing improved yields, 73% on a 4.5 kg scale, of the desired benzodioxazole synthetic intermediate.

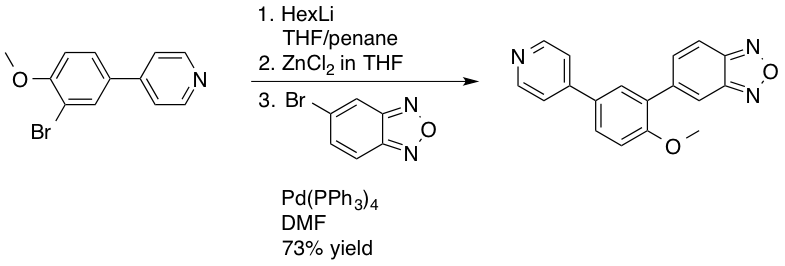
Synthesis of benzodioxazole synthetic intermediate

=== Applications in total synthesis ===
Where the Negishi coupling is rarely used in industrial chemistry, a result of the aforementioned water and oxygen sensitivity, it finds wide use in the field of natural products total synthesis. The increased reactivity relative to other cross-coupling reactions makes the Negishi coupling ideal for joining complex intermediates in the synthesis of natural products. Additionally, Zn is more environmentally friendly than other metals such as Sn used in the Stille coupling. The Negishi coupling historically is not used as much as the Stille or Suzuki coupling. When it comes to fragment-coupling processes the Negishi coupling is particularly useful, especially when compared to the aforementioned Stille and Suzuki coupling reactions. The major drawback of the Negishi coupling, aside from its water and oxygen sensitivity, is its relative lack of functional group tolerance when compared to other cross-coupling reactions.

(−)-stemoamide is a natural product found in the root extracts of ‘’Stemona tuberosa’’. These extracts have been used Japanese and Chinese folk medicine to treat respiratory disorders, and (−)-stemoamide is also an anthelminthic. Somfai and coworkers employed a Negishi coupling in their synthesis of (−)-stemoamide. The reaction was implemented mid-synthesis, forming an sp^{3}-sp^{2} c-c bond between β,γ-unsaturated ester and an intermediate diene 4 with a 78% yield of product 5. Somfai completed the stereoselective total synthesis of (−)-stemoamide in 12-steps with a 20% overall yield.

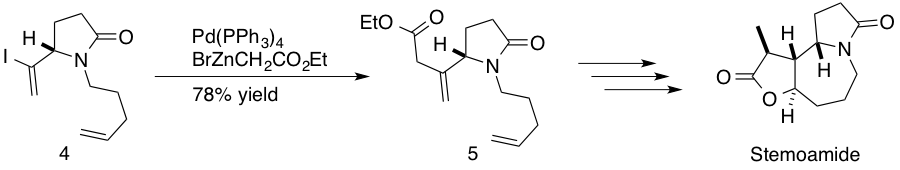
Synthesis of (−)-stemoamide

Kibayashi and coworkers utilized the Negishi coupling in the total synthesis of Pumiliotoxin B. Pumiliotoxin B is one of the major toxic alkaloids isolated from Dendrobates pumilio, a Panamanian poison frog. These toxic alkaloids display modulatory effects on voltage-dependent sodium channels, resulting in cardiotonic and myotonic activity. Kibayashi employed the Negishi coupling late stage in the synthesis of Pumiliotoxin B, coupling a homoallylic sp^{3} carbon on the zinc alkylidene indolizidine 6 with the (E)-vinyl iodide 7 with a 51% yield. The natural product was then obtained after deprotection.

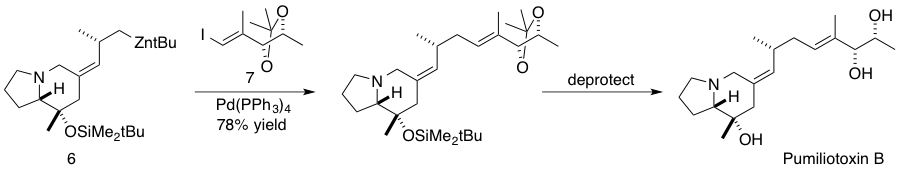
Synthesis of Pumiliotoxin B

δ-trans-tocotrienoloic acid isolated from the plant, Chrysochlamys ulei, is a natural product shown to inhibit DNA polymerase β (pol β), which functions to repair DNA via base excision. Inhibition of pol B in conjunction with other chemotherapy drugs may increase the cytotoxicity of these chemotherapeutics, leading to lower effective dosages. The Negishi coupling was implemented in the synthesis of δ-trans-tocotrienoloic acid by Hecht and Maloney coupling the sp^{3} homopropargyl zinc reagent 8 with sp^{2} vinyl iodide 9. The reaction proceeded with quantitative yield, coupling fragments mid-synthesis en route to the stereoselectively synthesized natural product δ-trans-tocotrienoloic acid.

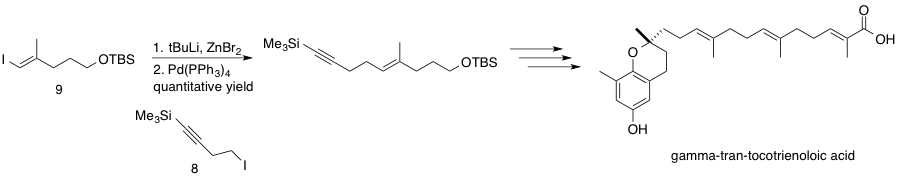
Synthesis of δ-trans-tocotrienoloic acid

Smith and Fu demonstrated that their method to couple secondary nucleophiles with secondary alkyl electrophiles could be applied to the formal synthesis of α-cembra-2,7,11-triene-4,6-diol, a target with antitumor activity. They achieved a 61% yield on a gram scale using their method to install an iso-propyl group. This method would be highly adaptable in this application for diversification and installing other alkyl groups to enable structure-activbity relationship (SAR) studies.

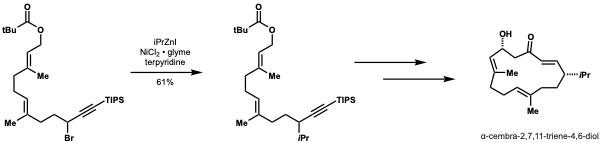

Kirschning and Schmidt applied nickel catalyzed negishi cross-coupling to the first total synthesis of carolacton. In this application, they achieved 82% yield and dr = 10:1.

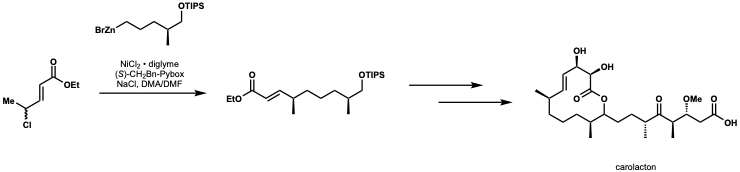

== Preparation of organozinc precursors ==
Alkylzinc reagents can be accessed from the corresponding alkyl bromides using iodine in dimethylacetamide (DMAC). The catalytic I_{2} serves to activate the zinc towards nucleophilic addition.

Aryl zincs can be synthesized using mild reaction conditions via a Grignard like intermediate.

$$\begin{matrix} {}\\
\ce{Ar-I ->[\begin{matrix}\ce{iPrMgCl}\\\text{THF}\end{matrix}][\ce{ZnBr2}] Ar-ZnBr}
\end{matrix}$$

Organozincs can also be generated in situ and used in a one pot procedure as demonstrated by Knochel et al.

$$\begin{array}{c}\\ \ce{R-X ->[\begin{matrix}\ce{Zn} \\ \ce{LiCl}\end{matrix}][\text{THF}] R-ZnX.LiCl ->[\begin{matrix}\ce{[Pd]} \\ \ce{ArBr}\end{matrix}] Ar-R} \end{array}$$

== See also ==
- CPhos
- Heck reaction
- Suzuki reaction
