= SPhos =

Names
- Preferred IUPAC name Dicyclohexyl(2′,6′-dimethoxy[1,1′-biphenyl]-2-yl)phosphane
- Other names SPhos

Identifiers
CAS Number	657408-07-6
3D model (JSmol)	Interactive image
ChemSpider	9444883
ECHA InfoCard	100.122.873
PubChem CID	11269872
UNII	XI1MQ32186
CompTox Dashboard (EPA)	DTXSID90460730
- InChI: InChI=1S/C26H35O2P/c1-27-23-17-11-18-24(28-2)26(23)22-16-9-10-19-25(22)29(20-12-5-3-6-13-20)21-14-7-4-8-15-21/h9-11,16-21H,3-8,12-15H2,1-2H3 Key: VNFWTIYUKDMAOP-UHFFFAOYSA-N; InChI=1/C26H35O2P/c1-27-23-17-11-18-24(28-2)26(23)22-16-9-10-19-25(22)29(20-12-5-3-6-13-20)21-14-7-4-8-15-21/h9-11,16-21H,3-8,12-15H2,1-2H3 Key: VNFWTIYUKDMAOP-UHFFFAOYAH
- SMILES: COc1cccc(c1c2ccccc2P(C3CCCCC3)C4CCCCC4)OC

Properties
Chemical formula	C_{26}H_{35}O_{2}P
Molar mass	410.53 g/mol
Appearance	colorless solid
Melting point	164 to 166 °C (327 to 331 °F; 437 to 439 K)
Solubility	soluble in organic solvents
- Except where otherwise noted, data are given for materials in their standard state (at 25 °C [77 °F], 100 kPa). verify (what is ?) Infobox references

SPhos is a phosphine ligand derived from biphenyl. Its palladium complexes exhibit high activity for Suzuki coupling reactions involving aryl chlorides, which are unreactive with palladium complexes of most other phosphine ligands. The ligand has convenient handling characteristics since it is air-stable.

== See also ==
- XPhos
- CPhos
- Suzuki reaction
