= Tetrakis(triphenylphosphine)palladium(0) =

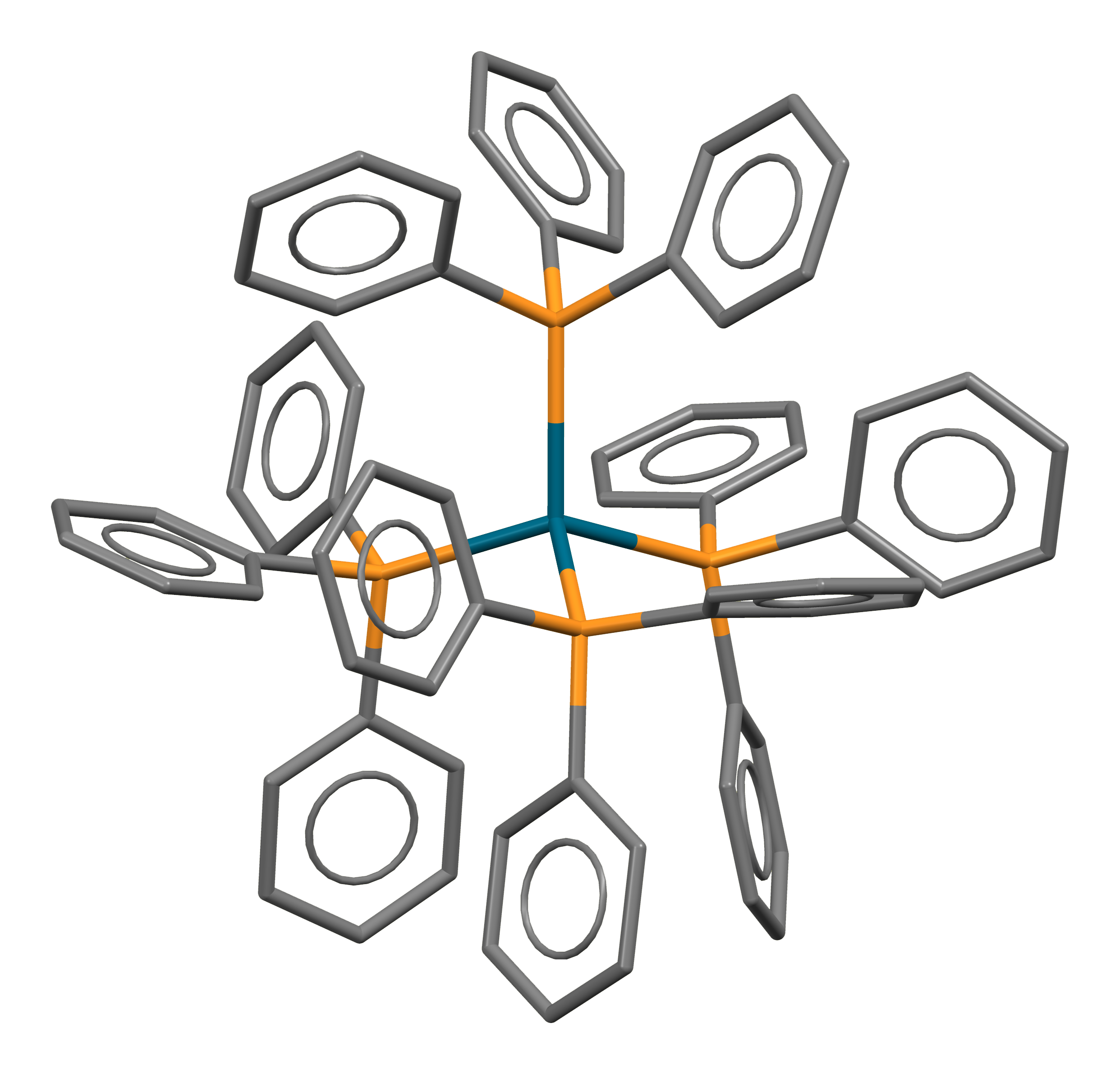
- 3D model of the tetrakis(triphenylphosphine)palladium(0) molecule

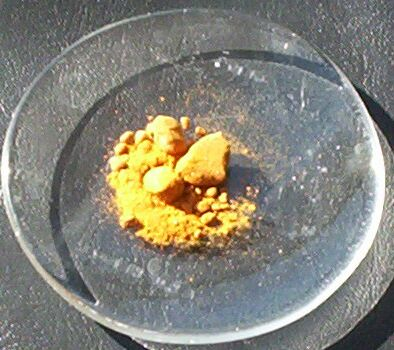
- Tetrakis(triphenylphosphine)palladium(0)

Names
- IUPAC name Tetrakis(triphenylphosphane)palladium(0)
- Other names TPP palladium(0)

Identifiers
CAS Number	14221-01-3
3D model (JSmol)	Interactive image
ChemSpider	10152942
ECHA InfoCard	100.034.609
EC Number	238-086-9
PubChem CID	11979704
UNII	N9O1RWZ93J
CompTox Dashboard (EPA)	DTXSID9065732
- InChI: InChI=1S/4C18H15P.Pd/c4*1-4-10-16(11-5-1)19(17-12-6-2-7-13-17)18-14-8-3-9-15-18;/h4*1-15H; Key: NFHFRUOZVGFOOS-UHFFFAOYSA-N
- SMILES: [Pd-4]([P+](c1ccccc1)(c1ccccc1)c1ccccc1)([P+](c1ccccc1)(c1ccccc1)c1ccccc1)([P+](c1ccccc1)(c1ccccc1)c1ccccc1)[P+](c1ccccc1)(c1ccccc1)c1ccccc1

Properties
Chemical formula	C_{72}H_{60}P_{4}Pd
Molar mass	1155.59 g·mol^{−1}
Appearance	Bright yellow to chartreuse crystals
Melting point	decomposes around 115 °C
Solubility in water	Insoluble

Structure
Coordination geometry	four triphenylphosphine monodentate ligands attached to a central Pd(0) atom in a tetrahedral geometry
Molecular shape	tetrahedral
Dipole moment	0 D

Hazards
- GHS labelling
Pictograms	(GHS07: Exclamation mark)
Signal word	Warning
Hazard statements	H302, H317, H413
Precautionary statements	P261, P264, P270, P272, P273, P280, P301+P312, P302+P352, P330, P333+P313, P363, P501
NFPA 704 (fire diamond)	2 1

Related compounds
Related complexes	chlorotris(triphenylphosphine)rhodium(I) tris(dibenzylideneacetone)dipalladium(0) Tetrakis(triphenylphosphine)platinum(0); Tetrakis(triphenylphosphine)nickel(0)
Related compounds	triphenylphosphine
- Except where otherwise noted, data are given for materials in their standard state (at 25 °C [77 °F], 100 kPa). verify (what is ?) Infobox references

Tetrakis(triphenylphosphine)palladium(0) (sometimes called quatrotriphenylphosphine palladium) is the chemical compound [Pd(P(C_{6}H_{5})_{3})_{4}], often abbreviated Pd(PPh_{3})_{4}, or rarely PdP_{4}. It is a bright yellow crystalline solid that becomes brown upon decomposition in air.

== Structure and properties ==
The four phosphorus atoms are at the corners of a tetrahedron surrounding the palladium(0) center. This structure is typical for four-coordinate 18 e^{−} complexes. The corresponding complexes Ni(PPh_{3})_{4} and Pt(PPh_{3})_{4} are also well known. Such complexes reversibly dissociate PPh_{3} ligands in solution, so reactions attributed to Pd(PPh_{3})_{4} often in fact arise from Pd(PPh_{3})_{3} or even Pd(PPh_{3})_{2}.

== Preparation ==
Tetrakis(triphenylphosphine)palladium(0) was first prepared by Lamberto Malatesta et al. in the 1950s by reduction of sodium chloropalladate with hydrazine in the presence of the phosphine. It is commercially available, but can be prepared in two steps from Pd(II) precursors:

PdCl_{2} + 2 PPh_{3} → PdCl_{2}(PPh_{3})_{2}
PdCl_{2}(PPh_{3})_{2} + 2 PPh_{3} + 5/2 N_{2}H_{4} → Pd(PPh_{3})_{4} + 1/2 N_{2} + 2 N_{2}H_{5}Cl

Both steps may be carried out in a one-pot reaction, without isolating and purifying the PdCl_{2}(PPh_{3})_{2} intermediate. Reductants other than hydrazine can be employed, including ascorbic acid. The compound is sensitive to air, but can be purified by washing with methanol to give the desired yellow powder. It is usually stored cold under argon.

== Applications ==
Pd(PPh_{3})_{4} is widely used as a catalyst for palladium-catalyzed coupling reactions. Prominent applications include the Heck reaction, Suzuki coupling, Stille coupling, Sonogashira coupling, and Negishi coupling. These processes begin with two successive ligand dissociations followed by the oxidative addition of an aryl halide to the Pd(0) center:

Pd(PPh_{3})_{4} + ArBr → PdBr(Ar)(PPh_{3})_{2} + 2 PPh_{3}
