= 1,3,2,4-Dithiadiphosphetane 2,4-disulfides =

Class of organic compounds

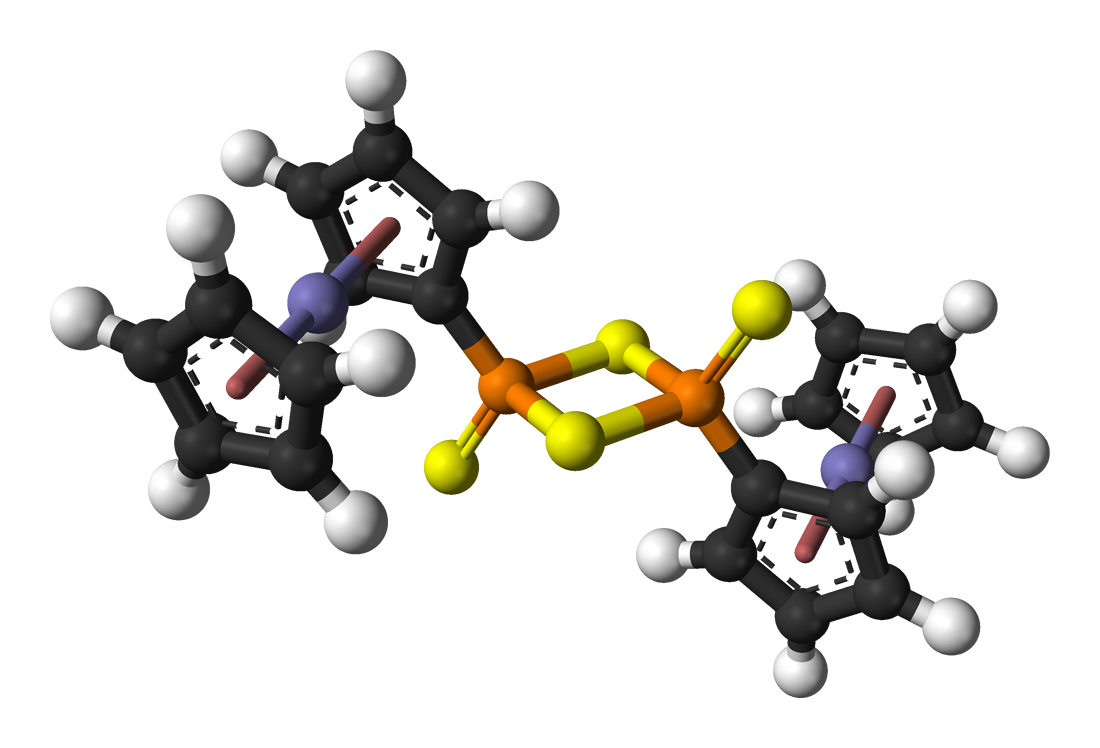
Ball-and-stick model of diferrocenyl 1,3,2,4-dithiadiphosphetane 2,4-disulfide Fc_{2}P_{2}S_{4}, where Fc is ferrocenyl group

1,3,2,4-Dithiadiphosphetane 2,4-disulfides are a class of organophosphorus, four-membered ring compounds which contain a P_{2}S_{2} ring. Many of these compounds are able to act as sources of the dithiophosphine ylides; the most well known example is Lawesson's reagent.

Other examples of this class of compound have been made; many inorganic chemists are now using Fc_{2}P_{2}S_{4} (Fc = ferrocene) as a starting material in reactions investigating the general chemistry of the 1,3,2,4-dithiadiphosphetane 2,4-disulfides, one reaction for this is that the Fc_{2}P_{2}S_{4} compound and all its derivatives are red which make column chromatography of the products more easy. Also the ferrocenyl groups provide an electrochemical handle which provide another means of investigating the properties of the products.

== Examples ==
While several different routes to the 1,3,2,4-dithiadiphosphetane 2,4-disulfides exist the most commonly used is the electrophilic aromatic substitution reaction of an arene with P_{4}S_{10}. An alternative reaction is the reaction of a thiol with P_{4}S_{10} to form a substance like the Davy reagent. The Davy reagent is identical to Lawesson's reagent except in place of the para-methoxyphenyl groups it has aryl sulfide groups. While the Davy reagent is more soluble than the Lawesson's reagent it is likely that the very vile nature of the thiol starting material is likely to make the synthesis of this compound not worth the trouble. In both the patent and academic chemical literature are examples of 1,3,2,4-dithiadiphosphetane 2,4-disulfides with higher solubilities. These highly soluble versions of Lawesson's reagent are created by the reaction of P_{4}S_{10} with aryl ethers which are different from anisole. For instance butoxybenzene and 2-tert-butylanisole have both been reacted to form more soluble thionation reagents of the 1,3,2,4-dithiadiphosphetane 2,4-disulfide class.

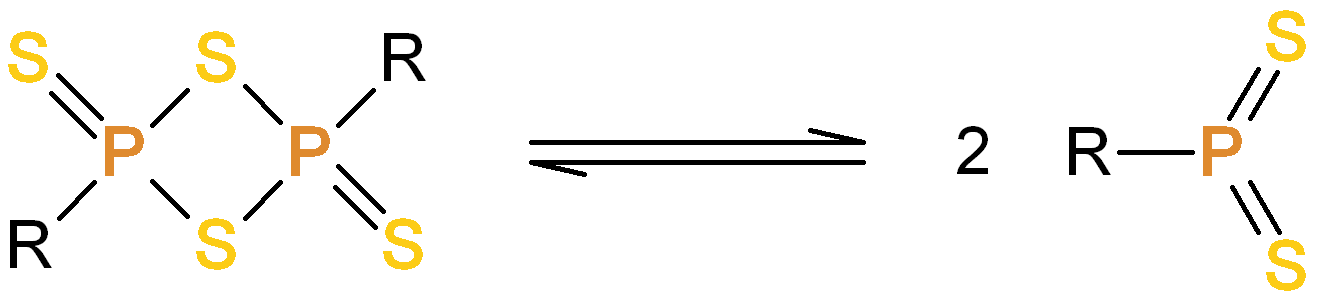
The general structure of a 1,3,2,4-dithiadiphosphetane 2,4-disulfide and the reversible generation of the dithiophosphine ylides

An important subclass of these compounds are the naphthalen-1,8-diyl 1,3,2,4-dithiadiphosphetane 2,4-disulfides; these are intellectually interesting because the two dithiophosphine ylides are fixed together in space by the rigid naphthalene unit. The reactivity of these compounds is very different from that of 1,3,2,4-dithiadiphosphetane 2,4-disulfides.

== Reactions ==
The dithiophosphine ylides are normally attacked at the phosphorus atom by a nucleophile, for instance the reaction of an alkoxide, phenolate, alcohol or phenol with a 1,3,2,4-dithiadiphosphetane 2,4-disulfide can form a new compound with a phosphorus-oxygen bond. Such a reaction has been used in the formation of metal binding agents and in the synthesis of insecticides.

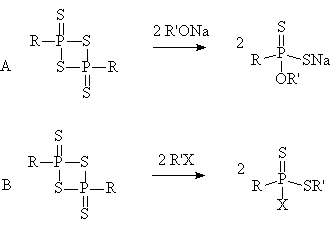
The reaction of a 1,3,2,4-dithiadiphosphetane 2,4-disulfide with either a nucleophile or an electrophile

The reaction of an electrophile with 1,3,2,4-dithiadiphosphetane 2,4-disulfides is less common, but the reaction of an alkyl halide with a 1,3,2,4-dithiadiphosphetane 2,4-disulfide forms a new compound with a sulfur-carbon bond and a phosphorus-halide bond. Such a compound could act as an acetylcholinesterase inhibitor in insects, but in order to make a better insecticide it would be best to convert the halide to another leaving group which would form a less water sensitive product. For instance the reaction of para-nitrophenolate would form a compound similar to parathion.

Lawesson's reagent has been used as a starting material for a herbicide by reaction with a 1-alkoxy-2,3-dihydroxy propane. This formed a compound which could be used to kill plants. This reaction of a 1,2-diol with lawesson's reagent results in a symmetric breaking of the P_{2}S_{2} ring, both halves of the lawesson's reagent end up being converted to the same product.

A different type of ring breaking reaction can occur when Lawesson's reagent is reacted with a metal compounds such as a platinum dichloride bis-phosphine complex, in this case one molecule of MeOC_{6}H_{4}P(S)Cl_{2} is formed as a side product to the platinum complex ([Pt(S_{2}P(S)C_{6}H_{4}OMe)(PR_{3})_{2}]).

Lawesson's reagent can be used as a dehydrating reagent, for example it has been used to convert a β-aminoamide into an imidazoline.

Another useful reaction of Lawesson's reagent is the conversion of a 1,4-diketone into a thiophene ring, this reaction can be done with P_{4}S_{10} but a much higher temperature would be required to make it work with P_{4}S_{10}.

It was claimed in a German patent that the reaction of 1,3,2,4-dithiadiphosphetane 2,4-disulfides with dialkyl cyanamides formed plant protection agents which contained six-membered (P−N=C−N=C−S−) rings. It has been proven in recent times by the reaction of diferrocenyl 1,3,2,4-dithiadiphosphetane 2,4-disulfide (and Lawesson's reagent) with dimethyl cyanamide that in fact a mixture of several different phosphorus containing compounds is formed. Depending on the concentration of the dimethyl cyanamide in the reaction mixture either a different six membered ring compound (P−N=C−S−C=N−) or a non-heterocylic compound (FcP(S)(NR_{2})(NCS)) is formed as the major product, the other compound is formed as a minor product.

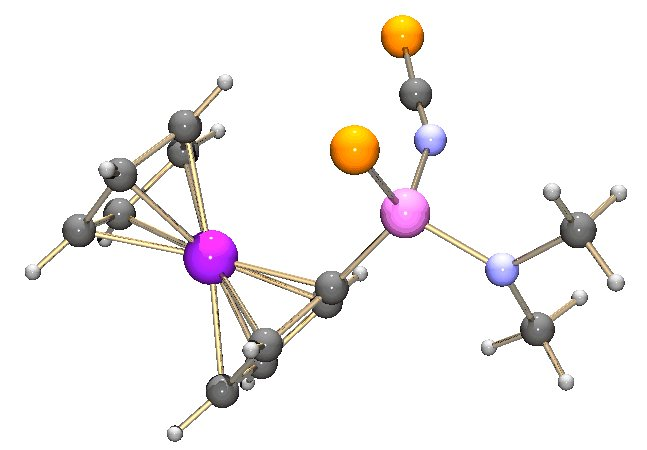
One of the products of the reaction of Fc_{2}P_{2}S_{4} with dimethyl cyanamide

In addition small traces of other compounds are also formed in the reaction. It is unlikely that the ring compound (P-N=C-S-C=N-) {or its isomer} would act as a plant protection agent, but (FcP(S)(NR_{2})(NCS)) compounds can act as nerve poisons in insects. These compounds bearing terminal sulfur atoms on the phosphorus atom are much less toxic than the compounds (such as sarin, VX and tetraethyl pyrophosphate) which have an oxygen in place of this terminal sulfur. This is because the P=S compound is not active as an acetylcholinesterase inhibitor in either mammals or insects, in mammals the animals metabolism tends to remove lipophilic side groups from the phosphorus atom while an insect tends to oxidise the compound so removing the terminal sulfur and replacing it with a terminal oxygen which causes the compound to be more able to act as an acetylcholinesterase inhibitor.

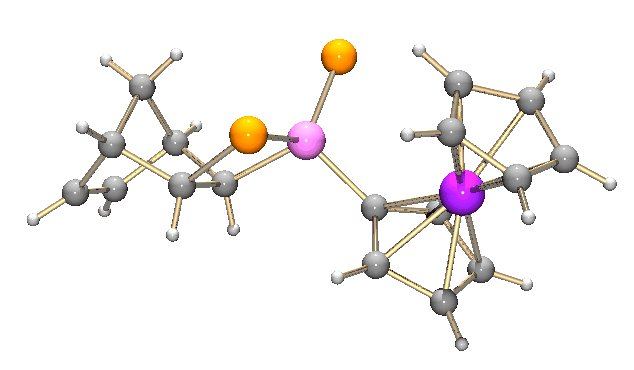
The structure of the PSC_{2} compound

The dithiophosphine ylides of LR and related compounds can react with strained alkenes, for example the bicyclic norbornadiene reacts with Fc_{2}P_{2}S_{4} to form a compound with a PSC_{2} ring. Unlike small rings containing only first row elements such as carbon, nitrogen and oxygen the small rings containing more heavy elements such as sulfur and selenium are more stable with regards to ring opening. Hence, the rings such as PSC_{2} are much more stable than things like epoxides.

A selenium version of this ring type has been made, one notable example has been named Woollins' reagent and is Ph_{2}P_{2}Se_{4}, this is made by the reaction of (PhP)_{5} with selenium metal. The solubility of this compound is very low but the group of Prof John Derek Woollins have published some reactions of this compound. For instance the reaction of Woollins' reagent with a dialkyl cyanamide has been found to form a bicyclic PC_{2}N_{2}Se_{3} system.
