= 2,4,6-Tribromoanisole =

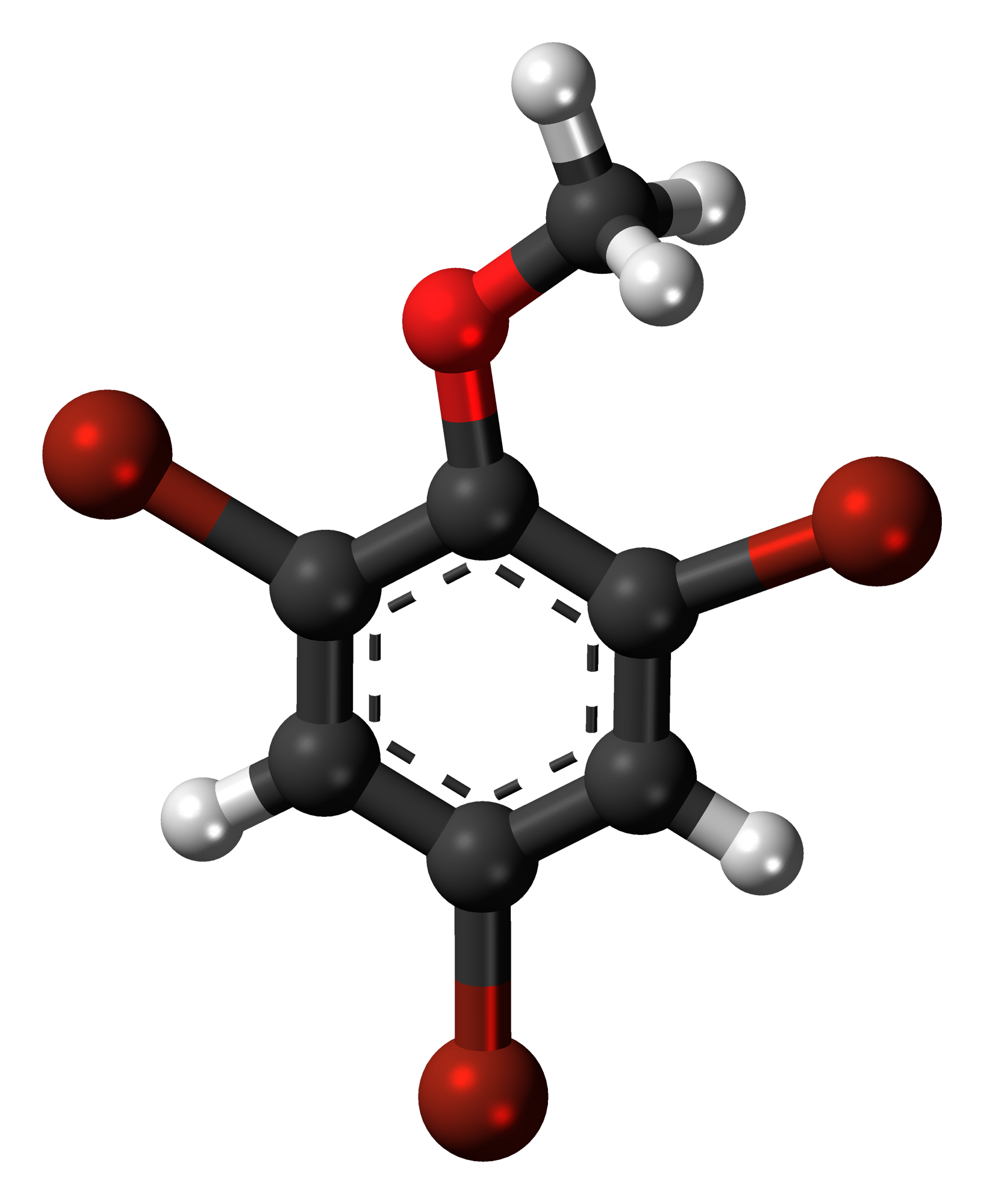

Names
- Preferred IUPAC name 1,3,5-Tribromo-2-methoxybenzene
- Other names Tribromoanisole; TBA

Identifiers
CAS Number	607-99-8
3D model (JSmol)	Interactive image; Interactive image
ChemSpider	21170966
ECHA InfoCard	100.156.226
PubChem CID	11839
UNII	DO7M3M4LX5
CompTox Dashboard (EPA)	DTXSID1060558
- InChI: InChI=1S/C7H5Br3O/c1-11-7-5(9)2-4(8)3-6(7)10/h2-3H,1H3 Key: YXTRCOAFNXQTKL-UHFFFAOYSA-N; InChI=1/C7H5Br3O/c1-11-7-5(9)2-4(8)3-6(7)10/h2-3H,1H3
- SMILES: COC1=C(C=C(C=C1Br)Br)Br; COc1c(Br)cc(Br)cc1Br

Properties
Chemical formula	C_{7}H_{5}Br_{3}O
Molar mass	344.828 g·mol^{−1}
Melting point	84 to 88 °C (183 to 190 °F; 357 to 361 K)
Boiling point	297 to 299 °C (567 to 570 °F; 570 to 572 K)
- Except where otherwise noted, data are given for materials in their standard state (at 25 °C [77 °F], 100 kPa). verify (what is ?) Infobox references

2,4,6-Tribromoanisole (TBA) is a chemical compound that is a brominated derivative of anisole. It is one of the chemicals responsible for cork taint.

Tribromoanisole is a fungal metabolite of 2,4,6-tribromophenol, which is used as a fungicide. It can be found in minute traces on packaging materials stored in the presence of fiberboard treated with 2,4,6-tribromophenol. These traces can cause an unpleasant mustiness in packaged foods.

Tribromoanisole is usually produced when naturally occurring airborne fungi or bacteria (usually Aspergillus sp., Penicillium sp., Actinomycetes, Botrytis cinerea, Rhizobium sp., or Streptomyces) are presented with brominated phenolic compounds, which they then convert into bromoanisole derivatives. The bromophenols can originate from various contaminants including those found in some pesticides and wood preservatives. They can also migrate from other objects such as shipping pallets treated by bromophenols.

Tribromoanisole has a very low odor detection threshold. It is 0.08-0.3 parts per trillion (ppt) in water and 2-6 ppt in wine (or 3.4-7.9 ng/L) so even very minute amounts can be detected. It causes unpleasant earthy, musty and moldy aromas.

== Consumer product recalls ==
There have been several events in which consumer products were recalled due to odors caused by tribromoanisole on product packaging. In 2010 and 2011, Johnson & Johnson voluntarily recalled some over-the-counter products, including Benadryl, Motrin, Rolaids, Simply Sleep, St. Joseph Aspirin, and Tylenol, due to an odor caused by tribromoanisole. In this case, a supplier had used 2,4,6-tribromophenol to treat wooden pallets on which product packaging materials were transported and stored. In 2010 and in 2011, Pfizer recalled bottles of Lipitor after reports of an odor linked to the packaging bottles. Pfizer said the bottles were supplied by a third-party manufacturer and determined the cause to be exposure of the bottles to low levels of tribromoanisole as they were shipped or stored.

== See also ==
- 2,4,6-Trichloroanisole
