= 2-(Diphenylphosphino)anisole =

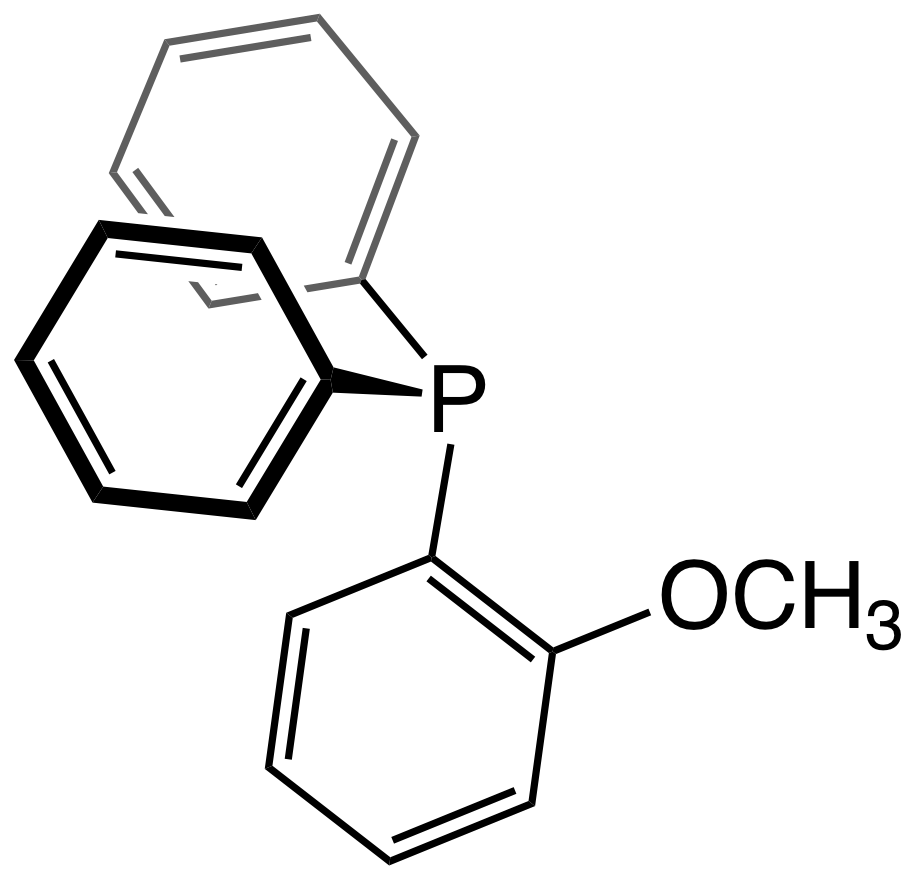

Names
- Preferred IUPAC name (2-Methoxyphenyl)di(phenyl)phosphane

Identifiers
CAS Number	53111-20-9
3D model (JSmol)	Interactive image
ChemSpider	524530
ECHA InfoCard	100.154.043
EC Number	625-558-8
PubChem CID	603401
CompTox Dashboard (EPA)	DTXSID60345287
- InChI: InChI=1S/C19H17OP/c1-20-18-14-8-9-15-19(18)21(16-10-4-2-5-11-16)17-12-6-3-7-13-17/h2-15H,1H3 Key: GBXNVYBGIFEOEM-UHFFFAOYSA-N
- SMILES: COc1ccccc1P(c2ccccc2)c3ccccc3

Properties
Chemical formula	C_{19}H_{17}OP
Molar mass	292.318 g·mol^{−1}
Appearance	white solid
Density	1.188 g/cm^{3}

Hazards
- GHS labelling
Pictograms	(GHS07: Exclamation mark)
Signal word	Warning
Hazard statements	H315, H319, H335
Precautionary statements	P261, P264, P271, P280, P302+P352, P304+P340, P305+P351+P338, P312, P321, P332+P313, P337+P313, P362, P403+P233, P405, P501
- Except where otherwise noted, data are given for materials in their standard state (at 25 °C [77 °F], 100 kPa). Infobox references

2-(Diphenylphosphino)anisole is the organophosphorus compound with the formula (C_{6}H_{5})_{2}PC_{6}H_{4}-2-OCH_{3}. It is a white solid that is soluble in organic solvents. The compound is used as a ligand in organometallic chemistry and homogeneous catalysis. It is the prototypical hemilabile ligand. This compound is prepared from 2-bromoanisole.

== Related ligands ==
- Tris(4-methoxyphenyl)phosphine
- Triphenylphosphine
