= 4-Bromoanisole =

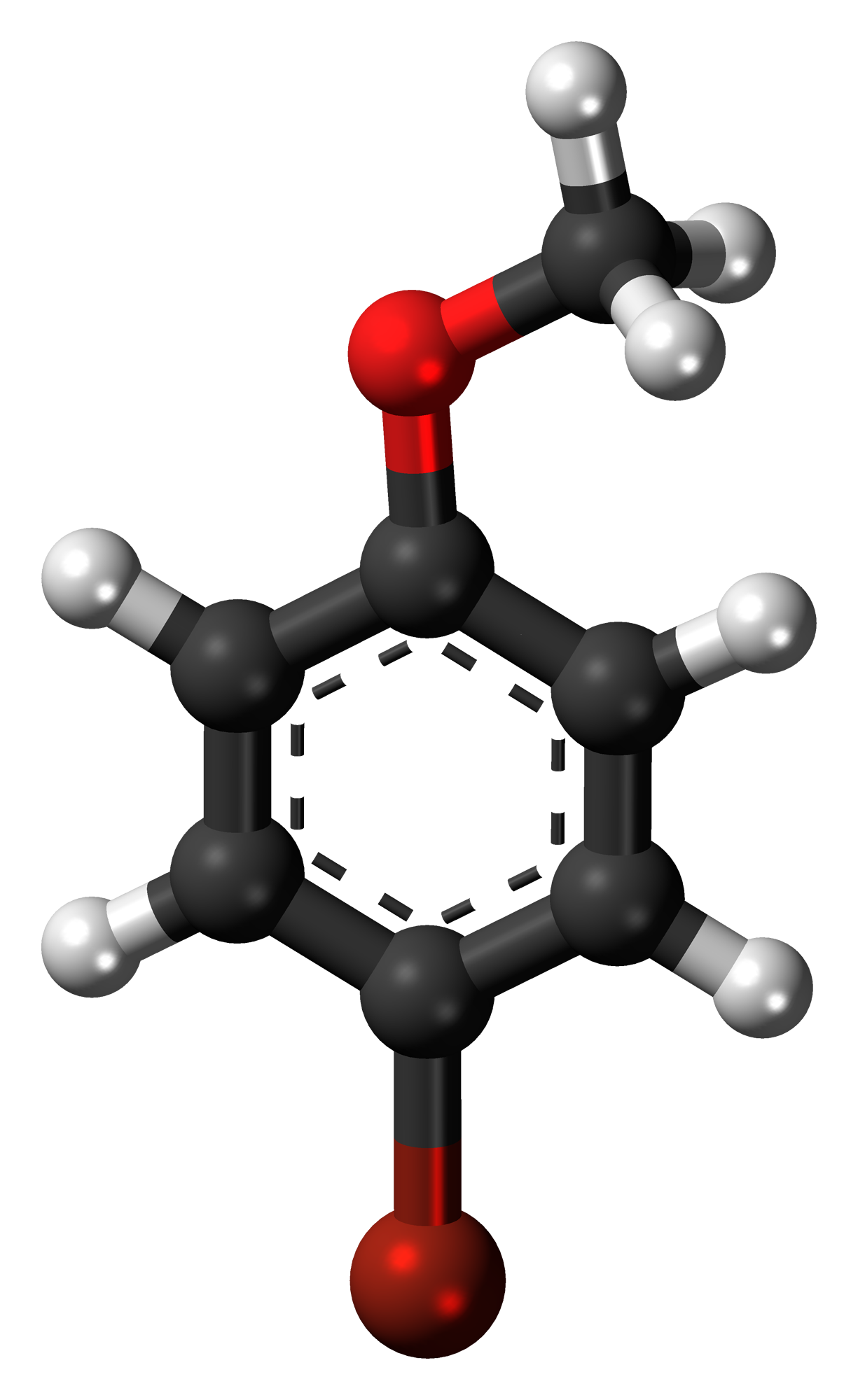

Names
- Preferred IUPAC name 1-Bromo-4-methoxybenzene
- Other names 4-Bromoanisole; para-Bromoanisole; p-Bromoanisole

Identifiers
CAS Number	104-92-7
3D model (JSmol)	Interactive image
ChEBI	CHEBI:47257
ChemSpider	13881571
ECHA InfoCard	100.002.957
PubChem CID	7730
UNII	U430F901J9
CompTox Dashboard (EPA)	DTXSID2059308
- InChI: InChI=1S/C7H7BrO/c1-9-7-4-2-6(8)3-5-7/h2-5H,1H3 Key: QJPJQTDYNZXKQF-UHFFFAOYSA-N; InChI=1/C7H7BrO/c1-9-7-4-2-6(8)3-5-7/h2-5H,1H3 Key: QJPJQTDYNZXKQF-UHFFFAOYAK
- SMILES: COc1ccc(cc1)Br

Properties
Chemical formula	C_{7}H_{7}BrO
Molar mass	187.036 g·mol^{−1}
Density	1.49 g/ml
Melting point	10 °C (50 °F; 283 K)
Boiling point	223 °C (433 °F; 496 K)
- Except where otherwise noted, data are given for materials in their standard state (at 25 °C [77 °F], 100 kPa). verify (what is ?) Infobox references

4-Bromoanisole is the organobromine compound with the formula CH_{3}OC_{6}H_{4}Br. It is a colorless liquid with a pleasant smell similar to that of anise seed. It is one of three isomers of bromoanisole, the others being 3-bromoanisole and 2-bromoanisole. It is the precursor to many 4-anisyl derivatives.

== Reactions and uses ==
4-Bromoanisole forms a Grignard reagent, which reacts with phosphorus trichloride to give tris(4-methoxyphenyl)phosphine:

3 CH_{3}OC_{6}H_{4}MgBr + PCl_{3} → (CH_{3}OC_{6}H_{4})_{3}P + 3 MgBrCl

4-Bromoanisole forms the organozinc derivative CH_{3}OC_{6}H_{4}ZnBr.

4-Bromoanisole is compound sometimes used in RNA extraction which serves to further eliminate DNA contamination. It interacts with genomic DNA (gDNA) and through a separation phase, it will be located in the organic layer instead of the aqueous layer (upper layer) containing the RNA extract.

== See also ==
- Anisole
