= WLA =

WLA may refer to:

- Airwaves Airlink (ICAO: WLA), a Zambian airline
- Harley-Davidson WLA, a motorcycle produced during World War 2
- Washington Library Association
- Weak-Link Approach, a molecular assembly methodology
- West Los Angeles, Los Angeles, California, a region within the Westside of Los Angeles County, a much larger area often referred to by the same name
- Western Lacrosse Association, a Senior A box lacrosse league in British Columbia, Canada
- White Ladies Aston, a village and civil parish in Worcestershire, England
- Winnebago Lutheran Academy, a Lutheran high school in Fond du Lac, Wisconsin
- Wisconsin Library Association
- Wyoming Library Association
- Women's Land Army, the name for several groups of women recruited in wartime to work in agriculture
- Workload Automation, an Information Technology tool used to automate IT and business processes.
- World Literature Assignment 1 and 2 in IB Group 1 subjects in the IB Diploma Programme
