= 2,4,6-Tribromophenol =

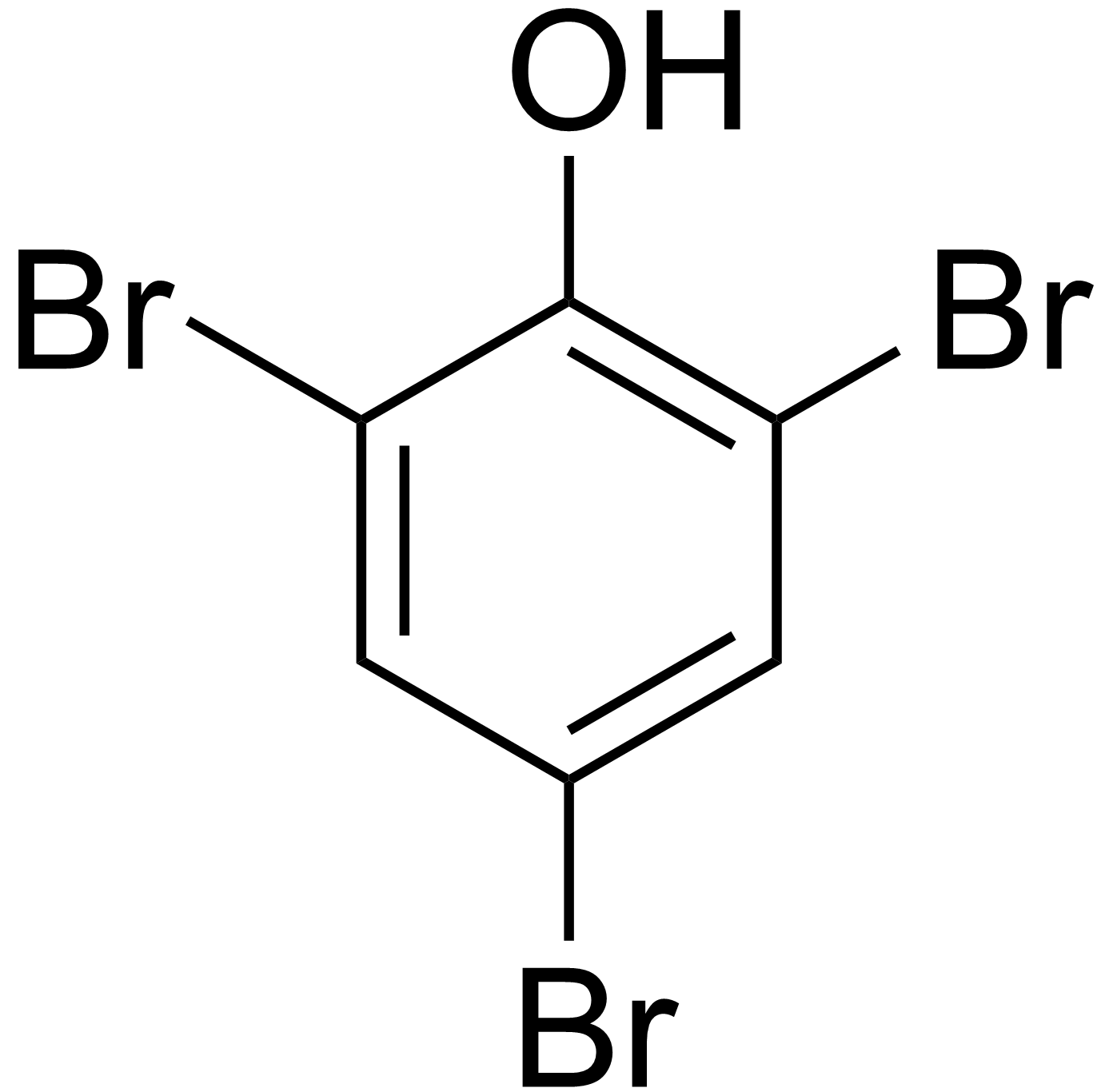

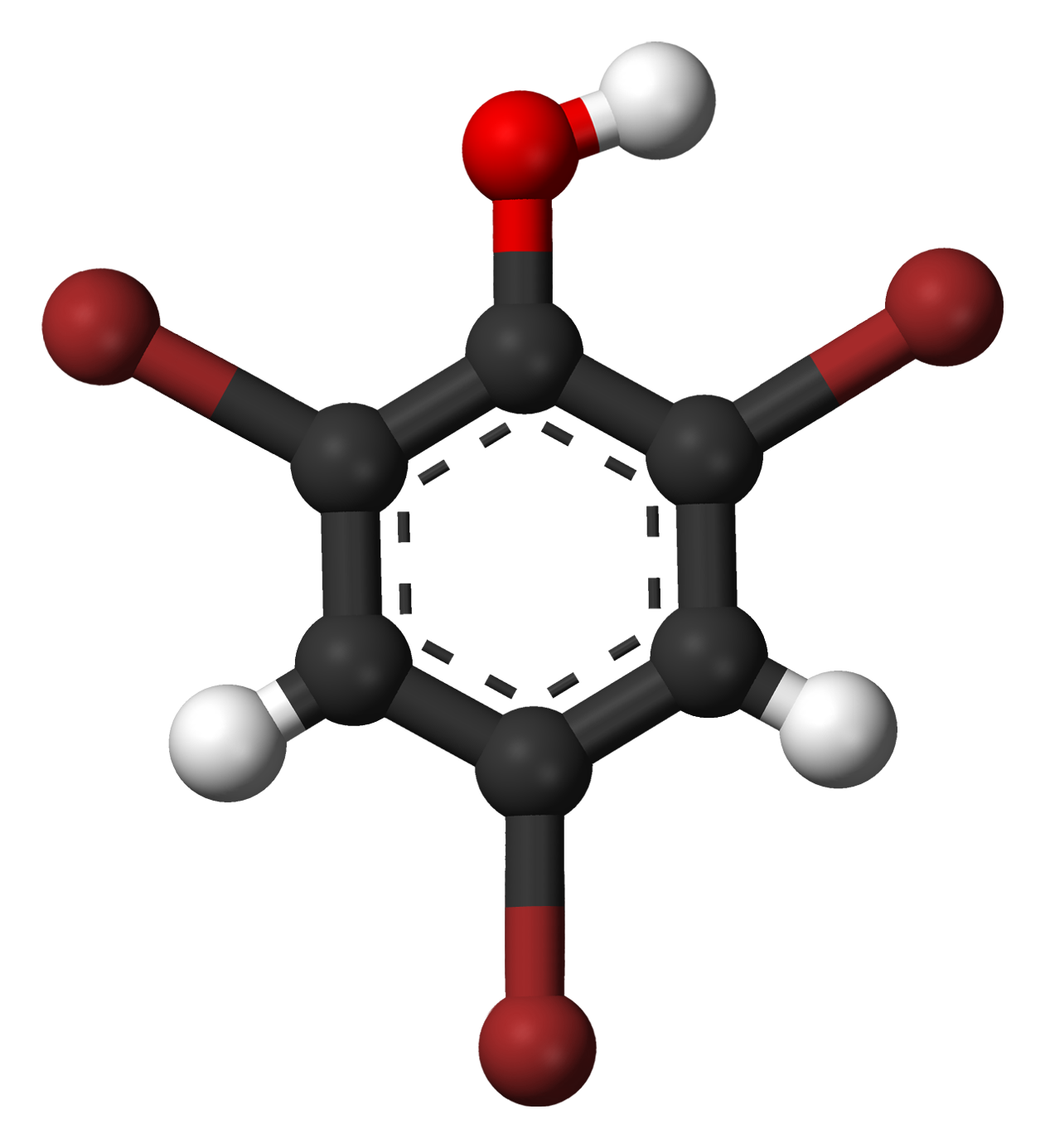

Names
- Preferred IUPAC name 2,4,6-Tribromophenol
- Other names Tribromophenol; 2,4,6-TBP; TBP

Identifiers
CAS Number	118-79-6
3D model (JSmol)	Interactive image
ChEBI	CHEBI:47696
ChEMBL	ChEMBL220087
ChemSpider	1438
DrugBank	DB02417
ECHA InfoCard	100.003.890
KEGG	C14454
PubChem CID	1483
UNII	YS6K3EU393
CompTox Dashboard (EPA)	DTXSID6021959
- InChI: InChI=1S/C6H3Br3O/c7-3-1-4(8)6(10)5(9)2-3/h1-2,10H Key: BSWWXRFVMJHFBN-UHFFFAOYSA-N; InChI=1/C6H3Br3O/c7-3-1-4(8)6(10)5(9)2-3/h1-2,10H Key: BSWWXRFVMJHFBN-UHFFFAOYAF
- SMILES: Brc1cc(Br)cc(Br)c1O

Properties
Chemical formula	C_{6}H_{3}Br_{3}O
Molar mass	330.801 g·mol^{−1}
Appearance	White needles or prisms
Melting point	95.5 °C (203.9 °F; 368.6 K)
Boiling point	244 °C (471 °F; 517 K); 286 °C
Solubility in water	Slightly soluble 59-61 mg/L

Hazards
- GHS labelling
Pictograms	(GHS07: Exclamation mark) (GHS09: Environmental hazard)
NFPA 704 (fire diamond)	2 0 0
- Lethal dose or concentration (LD, LC)
LD_{50} (median dose)	2000 mg/kg (rat, oral)
- Except where otherwise noted, data are given for materials in their standard state (at 25 °C [77 °F], 100 kPa). verify (what is ?) Infobox references

2,4,6-Tribromophenol (TBP) is a brominated derivative of phenol. It is used as a fungicide, as a wood preservative, and an intermediate in the preparation of flame retardants.

== Production ==
Although natural TBP has been identified in ocean sediments as a metabolite of marine fauna, the commercial product is prepared industrially. In 2001, the production volume of TBP was estimated to be 2500 tonnes/year in Japan and 9500 tonnes/year worldwide. TBP can be prepared by the controlled reaction of elemental bromine with phenol:

== Uses ==
The predominant use of TBP is as an intermediate in the preparation of flame retardants such as brominated epoxy resins. TBP is reacted with sodium hydroxide to form the sodium salt, which is used as a fungicide and wood preservative.

=== Bismuth salt ===
The bismuth salt is the active ingredient in Xeroform dressing.

== Metabolism ==
Microbial metabolism in products treated with TBP is known to produce 2,4,6-tribromoanisole (TBA), which has a musty odor. In 2010 and 2011, Pfizer and Johnson & Johnson voluntarily recalled some products due to TBA odors from wooden pallets which were treated with TBP.
