= Naphthalen-1,8-diyl 1,3,2,4-dithiadiphosphetane 2,4-disulfide =

Naphthalen-1,8-diyl 1,3,2,4- dithiadiphosphetane 2,4-disulfide
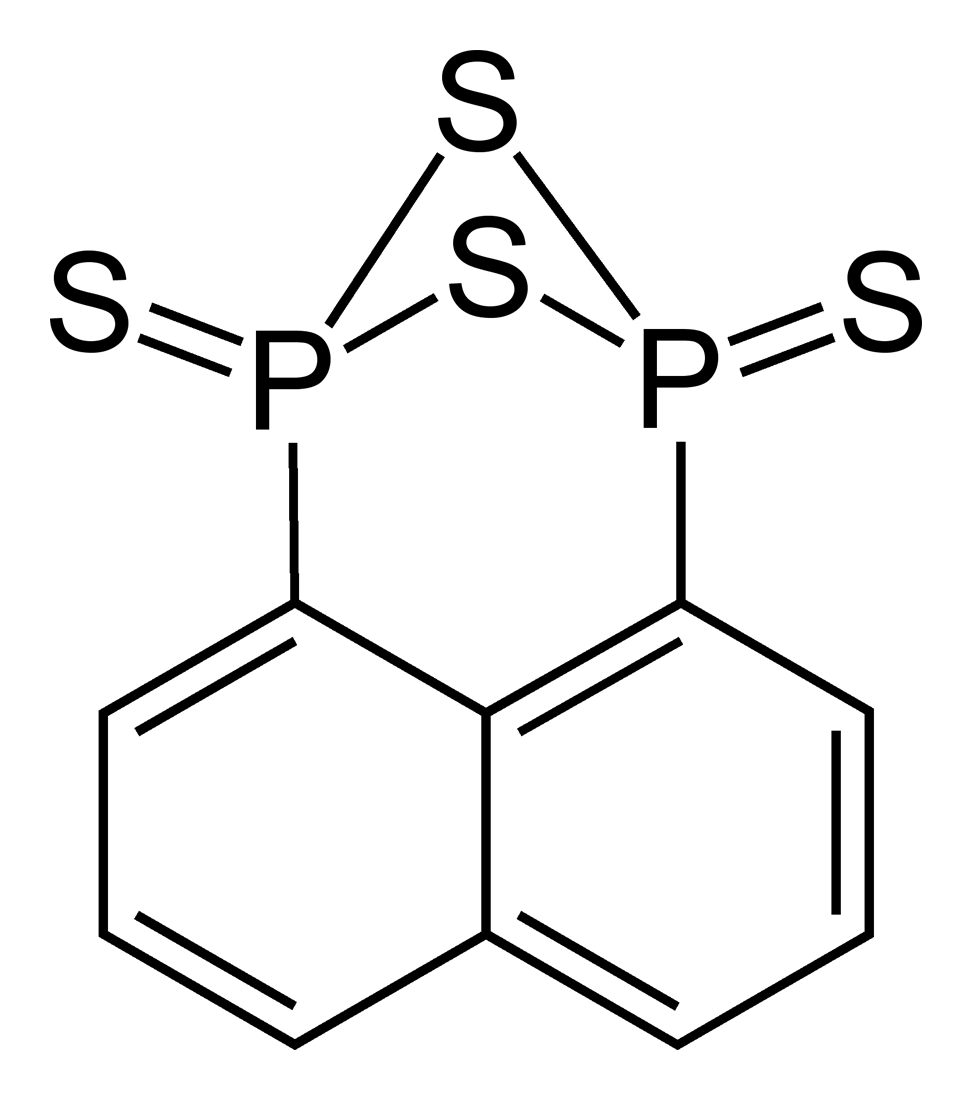
Wireframe model of naphthalen-1,8-diyl 1,3,2,4-dithiadiphosphetane 2,4-disulfide
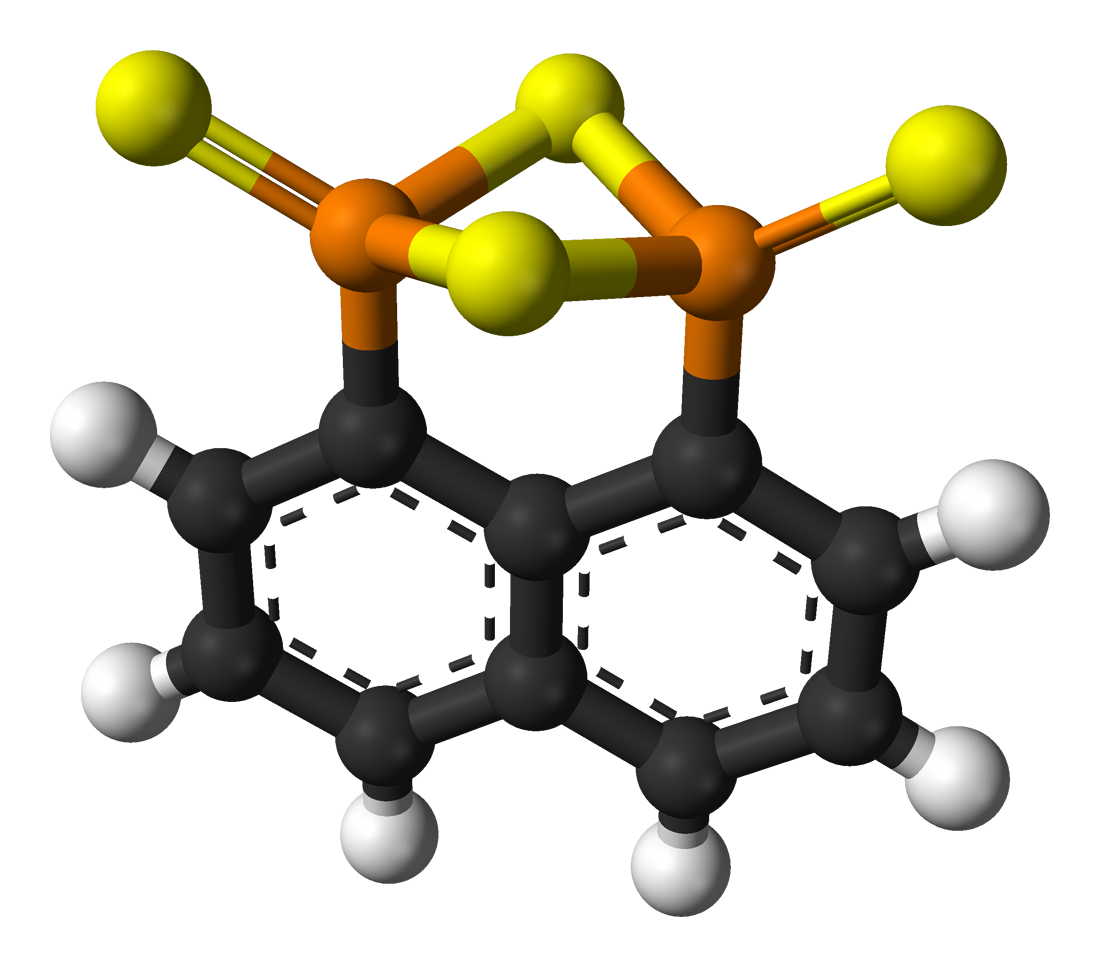
Ball and stick model of naphthalen-1,8-diyl 1,3,2,4-dithiadiphosphetane 2,4-disulfide

Names
- Preferred IUPAC name Naphthalen-1,8-diyl 1,3,2,4-dithiadiphosphetane 2,4-disulfide
- Systematic IUPAC name 3,14-Dithia-2λ^{5},4λ^{5}-diphosphatetracyclo[7.3.1. 1^{2,4}.0^{5,13}]tetradeca-1(12),5,7,9(13),10- pentaene-2,4-dithione

Identifiers
CAS Number	115505-46-9
3D model (JSmol)	Interactive image
ChemSpider	9419032
PubChem CID	11243996
CompTox Dashboard (EPA)	DTXSID401027021
- InChI: InChI=1S/C10H6P2S4/c13-11-8-5-1-3- 7-4-2-6-9(10(7)8)12(14,15-11) 16-11/h1-6H Key: NYHOAPMWYNAQJE-UHFFF AOYSA-N; InChI=1S/C10H6P2S4/c13-11-8-5-1-3-7-4-2-6-9(10(7)8)12(14,15-11)16-11/h1-6H; InChI=1S/C10H6P2S4/c13-11-8-5-1-3-7-4-2-6-9(10(7)8)12(14,15-11)16-11/h1-6H Key: NYHOAPMWYNAQJE-UHFFFAOYSA-N
- SMILES: S=P13SP(=S)(S1)c4c2c(cccc23)ccc4

Properties
Chemical formula	C_{10}H_{6}P_{2}S_{4}
Molar mass	316.36 g mol^{−1}
- Except where otherwise noted, data are given for materials in their standard state (at 25 °C [77 °F], 100 kPa). verify (what is ?) Infobox references

Naphthalen-1,8-diyl 1,3,2,4-dithiadiphosphetane 2,4-disulfide (sometimes noted as NpP_{2}S_{4}) is a compound related to Lawesson's reagent formed by the reaction of 1-bromonaphthalene with P_{4}S_{10}, this is a 1,3,2,4-dithiadiphosphetane 2,4-disulfide which has a naphth-1,8-diyl group holding the two phosphorus atoms together. The mechanism by which the NpP_{2}S_{4} forms is not yet elucidated, but it is thought to occur by a process involving free radicals, and naphthalene has been detected as a side product in its synthesis. In general, NpP_{2}S_{4} has been found to be less reactive than Lawesson's reagent, in agreement with the hypothesis that the dithiophosphine ylides are responsible for the majority of the chemical reactions of the 1,3,2,4-dithiadiphosphetane 2,4-disulfides.

NpP_{2}S_{4} has been found to react with many hydroxyl compounds, such as methanol, ethylene glycol and a catechol to form species with oxygen atoms bonded to the phosphorus atoms.

NpP_{2}S_{4} when refluxed in methanol reacts to form a heterocycle C_{12}H_{12}OP_{2}S with one O-methyl and one S-methyl bonded to the two phosphorus atoms.

The structure of the product of methanol and NpP2S4	The structure of the first product of NpP2S4 with ethylene glycol	The structure of the product of di-tert-butylcatechol with NpP2S4
The structure of the product of methanol and NpP_{2}S_{4}	The structure of the first product of NpP_{2}S_{4} with ethylene glycol	The structure of the product of di-tert-butylcatechol with NpP_{2}S_{4}
