= Hemilability =

Chemical property

In coordination chemistry and catalysis hemilability (hemi - half, lability - a susceptibility to change) refers to a property of many polydentate ligands which contain at least two electronically different coordinating groups, such as hard and soft donors. These hybrid or heteroditopic ligands form complexes where one coordinating group is easily displaced from the metal centre while the other group remains firmly bound; a behaviour which has been found to increase the reactivity of catalysts when compared to the use of more traditional ligands.

== Overview ==
In general, catalytic cycles can be divided into 3 stages:

1. Coordination of the starting material(s)
2. Catalytic transformation of the starting material(s) to the product(s)
3. Displacement of the product(s) to regain the catalyst (or pre-catalyst)

Traditionally the focus of catalytic research has been on the reaction taking place in the second stage, however there will be energy changes associated with the beginning and end steps due to their effect on the coordination sphere and geometry of the complex, as well as its oxidation number in cases of oxidative addition and reductive elimination. When these energy changes are large they can dictate the turn-over rate of the catalyst and hence its effectiveness.

Hemilabile ligands reduce the activation energy of these changes by readily undergoing partial and reversible displacement from the metal centre. Hence a co-ordinately saturated hemilabile complex will readily reorganise to allow the coordination of reagents but will also promote the ejection of products due to re-coordination of the labile section of the ligand. The low energy barrier between the fully and hemi coordinated states results in frequent inverconvertion between the two, which promotes a fast catalytic turn-over rate.

Hemilabile ligands dissociate in one of three main ways; an "on/off" mechanism where they are constantly dissociating and re-associating, a displacement mechanism where they dissociate easily when exposed to a competing substrate, or redox switching where the oxidation state of the ligand is used to tune its affinity for the metal center.

== Examples ==
- The oxidative addition of MeI to Ir(I) complexes was shown to proceed about 100 times faster with a hemilabile phosphane ligand compared to a very similar non-labile ligand.
- Hydrovinylation (olefin dimerisation), which is typically difficult to carry out enantioselectively, has been shown to proceed with high enantiomeric excess when using a chiral phosphine ligand with an appropriately placed hemilabile coordinating group. ^{(review article)} The Pauson–Khand reaction, which is conceptually similar, has also been shown to give improved results when hemilabile P,S type hybrid ligands were used.
- Iridium(I) complexes incorporating hemilabile ligands which contain methoxy, dimethylamino, and pyridine as donor functions have been shown to be effective catalysts for transfer hydrogenation.

== See also ==
- Scorpionate ligand
- Pincer ligand
- Weak-Link Approach (supramolecular chemistry)
- 2-(Diphenylphosphino)anisole
