= Sven-Olov Lawesson =

Swedish chemist

Sven-Olov Lawesson (9 September 1926, in Bräcke, Sweden – 5 March 1985) was a Swedish chemist known for his popularization of Lawesson's reagent within the chemical community.

He is also known for his 1982 work exploring the possibility of a connection between recreational use of amyl nitrite and an increased incidence of Kaposi's sarcoma in homosexual men.

Lawesson obtained his education at Uppsala University. He did most of his work at the University of Aarhus in Denmark and his last paper was published in 1986.

After finding that 2,4-bis(4-methoxyphenyl)-1,3,2,4-dithiadiphosphetane 2,4-disulfide was useful for some reactions, Lawesson undertook a general survey of the reactivity of organic compounds with this reagent. It is often named after him as Lawesson's reagent. The synthesis of thioketones is his most cited paper.

At one point S. O. Lawesson worked with the chemist N. M. Yousif. After Lawesson's death, Yousif has been working in Egypt and has been very active within the phosphorus sulfur chemical community. Yousif has published many new reactions of Lawesson's reagent.

Prof T. B. Rauchfuss, who is in the United States did some very important work on Lawesson's reagent. He did the ^{31}P NMR experiment which proved that Lawesson's reagent could form the dithiophosphine ylides in solution.
