= POCOP =

Names
- IUPAC name 1,3-Bis[(diphenylphosphino)oxy]benzene
- Preferred IUPAC name 1,3-Phenylene bis(diphenylphosphinite)
- Other names Resorcinolbisphosphinite; 1,3-Bis(diphenylphosphinooxy)benzene

Identifiers
| CAS Number | 279214-81-2 |
| 3D model (JSmol) | Interactive image |
| ChemSpider | 9345060 |
| PubChem CID | 11169966 |
| UNII | RV3YH2Y6FP |
| CompTox Dashboard (EPA) | DTXSID301241325 |
- InChI: InChI=1S/C30H24O2P2/c1-5-16-27(17-6-1)33(28-18-7-2-8-19-28)31-25-14-13-15-26(24-25)32-34(29-20-9-3-10-21-29)30-22-11-4-12-23-30/h1-24H Key: PFCIJALLGNUKRS-UHFFFAOYSA-N
- SMILES: O(c3cccc(OP(c1ccccc1)c2ccccc2)c3)P(c4ccccc4)c5ccccc5

Properties
| Chemical formula | C_{30}H_{24}O_{2}P_{2} |
| Molar mass | 478.468 g·mol^{−1} |
| Appearance | Yellow solid |
- Except where otherwise noted, data are given for materials in their standard state (at 25 °C [77 °F], 100 kPa). Infobox references

POCOP is a type of pincer ligand. Pincer type ligands are tridentate ligands that bind three sites on one plane of a metal complex. POCOP forms complexes with one M-C(aryl) bond and two phosphinite ligands. The term POCOP is used both for the ligand, with formula C_{6}H_{4}(OPPh_{2})_{2}, and its complexes, with formula C_{6}H_{3}(OPPh_{2})_{2}]^{−} (Ph = C_{6}H_{5})

== Synthesis and structure ==
Interest in POCOP arises from its easy synthesis, which accommodates many substituents on phosphorus and results in higher yields than other PCP analogues. The parent POCOP ligand is prepared by treating resorcinol with chlorodiphenylphosphine:

C_{6}H_{4}(OH)_{2} + 2 ClPPh_{2} → C_{6}H_{4}(OPPh_{2})_{2} + 2 HCl

Related ligands can be prepared from chlorodiisopropylphosphine.

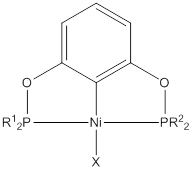
Structure of a Ni(POCOP)X complex.

Representative complexes are of the type Ni(POCOP)X (X = halide, alkyl, thiolate). The halides arise by direct reaction of the ligand and a nickel halide and offer a relatively cheap, nontoxic and readily available option of the ligand for various applications. There can also be variable conformations of POCOP pertaining to the various R groups branching off of the donor atoms.

Thermal ellipsoid plot of Ni(POCOP)Cl compound

In most cases the MPOCOP center features a planar MC_{3}O_{2}P_{2} core. The rigid conformation and square planar geometry of the POCOP ligand allow for systematic changes over the steric and electronic environment at the metal center. The geometry of metal compounds formed with POCOP ligands can be seen through the P-Ni-P (164.01 Å ) and C-Ni-Cl (178.31Å) bond angles found for (POCOP)NiCl. The bond angles of this compound are representative of angles found for several other pocop metal compounds. Because of relatively small P-Ni-P bond angle the otherwise Ni complexes exhibit a slight tetrahedral distortion.

== Catalytic reaction ==
Pincer ligands participate in a variety of organic transformation, such as the hydrosilylation, and ethylene oligomerizations, and homocoupling of benzyl halides. Ni PCP pincer complexes promote sulfur-carbon forming reactions.
