= Transition metal pincer complex =

Chemical compound

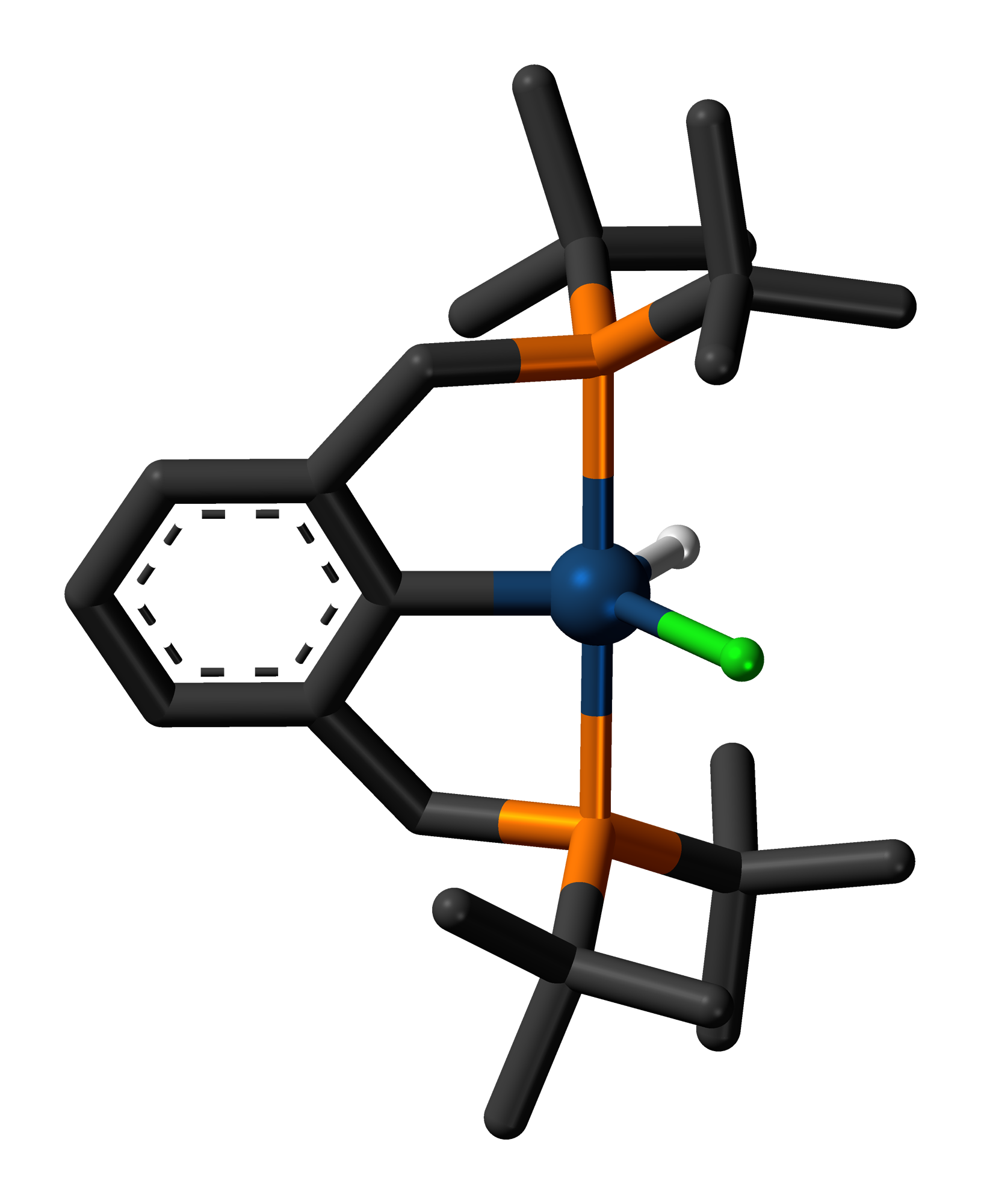
3D image of an iridium diphosphine pincer complex.

In chemistry, a transition metal pincer complex is a type of coordination complex with a pincer ligand. Pincer ligands are chelating agents that binds tightly to three adjacent coplanar sites in a meridional configuration. The inflexibility of the pincer-metal interaction confers high thermal stability to the resulting complexes. This stability is in part ascribed to the constrained geometry of the pincer, which inhibits cyclometallation of the organic substituents on the donor sites at each end. In the absence of this effect, cyclometallation is often a significant deactivation process for complexes, in particular limiting their ability to effect C–H bond activation. The organic substituents also define a hydrophobic pocket around the reactive coordination site. Stoichiometric and catalytic applications of pincer complexes have been studied at an accelerating pace since the mid-1970s. Most pincer ligands contain phosphines. Reactions of metal-pincer complexes are localized at three sites perpendicular to the plane of the pincer ligand, although in some cases one arm is hemi-labile and an additional coordination site is generated transiently. Early examples of pincer ligands (not called such originally) were anionic with a carbanion as the central donor site and flanking phosphine donors; these compounds are referred to as PCP pincers.

== Scope of pincer ligands ==
Although the most common class of pincer ligands features PCP donor sets, variations have been developed where the phosphines are replaced by thioethers and tertiary amines. Many pincer ligands also feature nitrogenous donors at the central coordinating group position (see figure), such as pyridines.

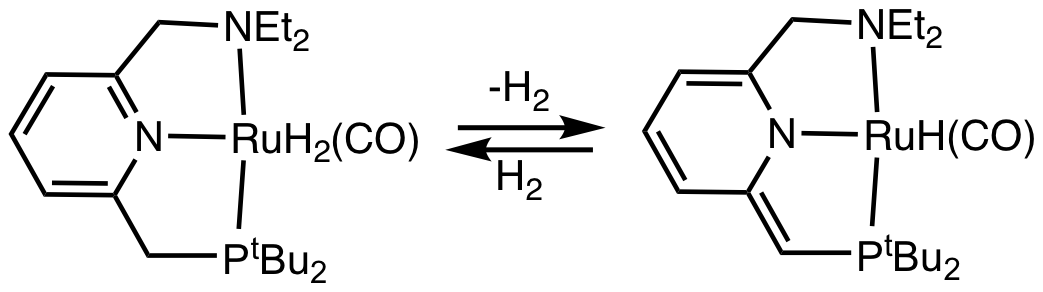
Reaction of H_{2} with a "Milstein catalyst" used for the dehydrocoupling of alcohols and amines.

An easily prepared pincer ligand is POCOP. Many tridentate ligands types occupy three contiguous, coplanar coordination sites. The most famous such ligand is terpyridine ("terpy"). Terpy and its relatives lack the steric bulk of the two terminal donor sites found in traditional pincer ligands.

Metal pincer complexes are often prepared through C–H bond activation.

Ni(II) N,N,N pincer complexes are active in Kumada, Sonogashira, and Suzuki-Miyaura coupling reactions with unactivated alkyl halides.

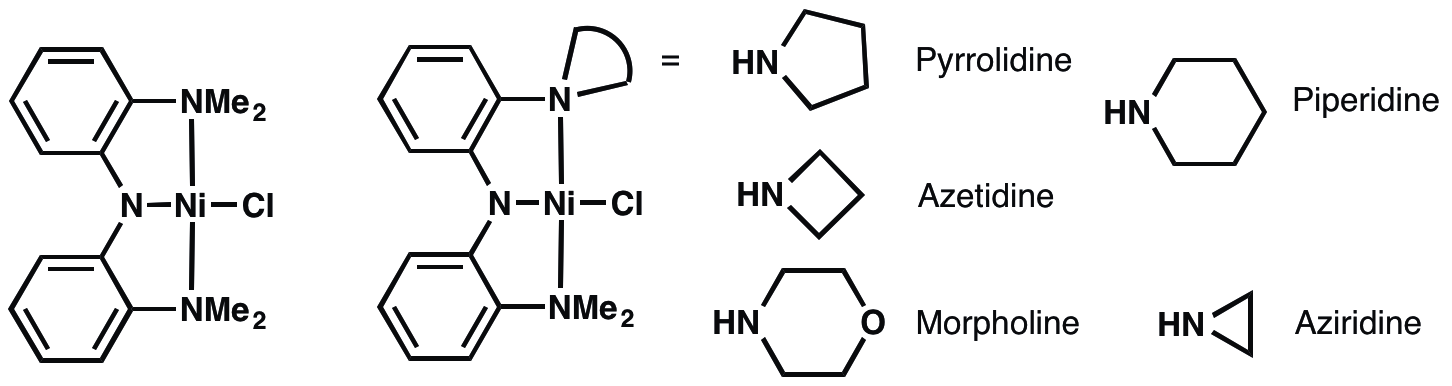
N,N,N-pincer complexes

== Types of pincer ligands ==
The pincer ligand is most often an anionic, two-electron donor to the metal centre. It consists of a rigid, planar backbone usually consisting of aryl frameworks and has two neutral, two-electron donor groups at the meta-positions. The general formula for pincer ligands is 2,6-(ER_{2})_{2}C_{6}H_{3} – abbreviated ECE – where E is the two-electron donor and C is the ipso-carbon of the aromatic backbone (e.g. PCP – two phosphine donors). Due to the firm tridentate coordination mode, it allows the metal complexes to exhibit high thermal stability as well as air-stability. It also implies that a reduced number of coordination sites are available for reactivity, which often limits the number of undesirable products formed in the reaction due to ligand exchange, as this process is suppressed.

There are various types of pincer ligands that are used in transition metal catalysis. Often, they have the same two-electron donor flanking the metal centre, but this is not a requirement.

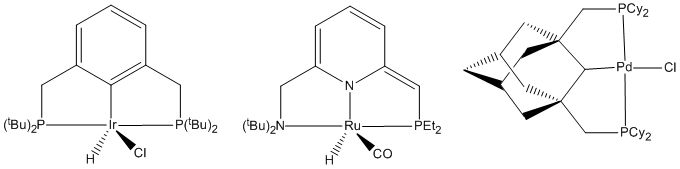
Examples of transition metal pincer complexes

The most common pincer ligand designs are PCP, NCN, PCN, SCS, and PNO. Other elements that have been employed at different positions in the ligand are boron, arsenic, silicon, and even selenium.

By altering the properties of the pincer ligands, it is possible to significantly alter the chemistry at the metal centre. Changing the hardness/softness of the donor, using electron-withdrawing groups (EWGs) in the backbone, and the altering the steric constraints of the ligands are all methods used to tune the reactivity at the metal centre.

== Synthesis ==
The synthesis of the ligands often involves the reaction between 1,3-dibromoethylbenzene with a secondary phosphine followed by deprotonation of the quaternary phosphorus intermediates to generate the ligand.

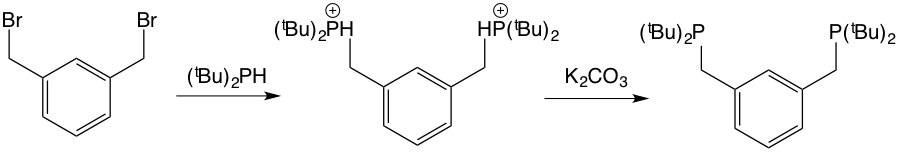
Synthesis of a diphosphine pincer ligand

To generate the metal complex, two common routes are employed. One is a simple oxidative addition of the ipso-C-X bond where X = Br, I to a metal centre, often a M(0) (M = Pd, Mo, Fe, Ru, Ni, Pt) though other metal complexes with higher oxidation states available can also be used (e.g. Rh(COD)Cl_{2}).

The other significant method of metal introduction is through C–H bond activation. The major difference is that the metal used in this method is already in a higher oxidation state (e.g. PdCl_{2} – Pd(II) species). However, these reactions have been found to proceed much more efficiently by employing metal complexes with weakly-bound ligands (e.g. Pd(BF_{4})_{2}(CH_{3}CN)_{2} or Pd(OTf)_{2}(CH_{3}CN)_{2} where OTf = F_{3}CO_{2}SO^{−}).

== Role in catalysis ==
The potential value of pincer ligands in catalysis has been investigated, although no process has been commercialized. Aspirational applications are motivated by the high thermal stability and rigidity. Disadvantages include the cost of the ligands.

=== Suzuki–Miyaura coupling ===
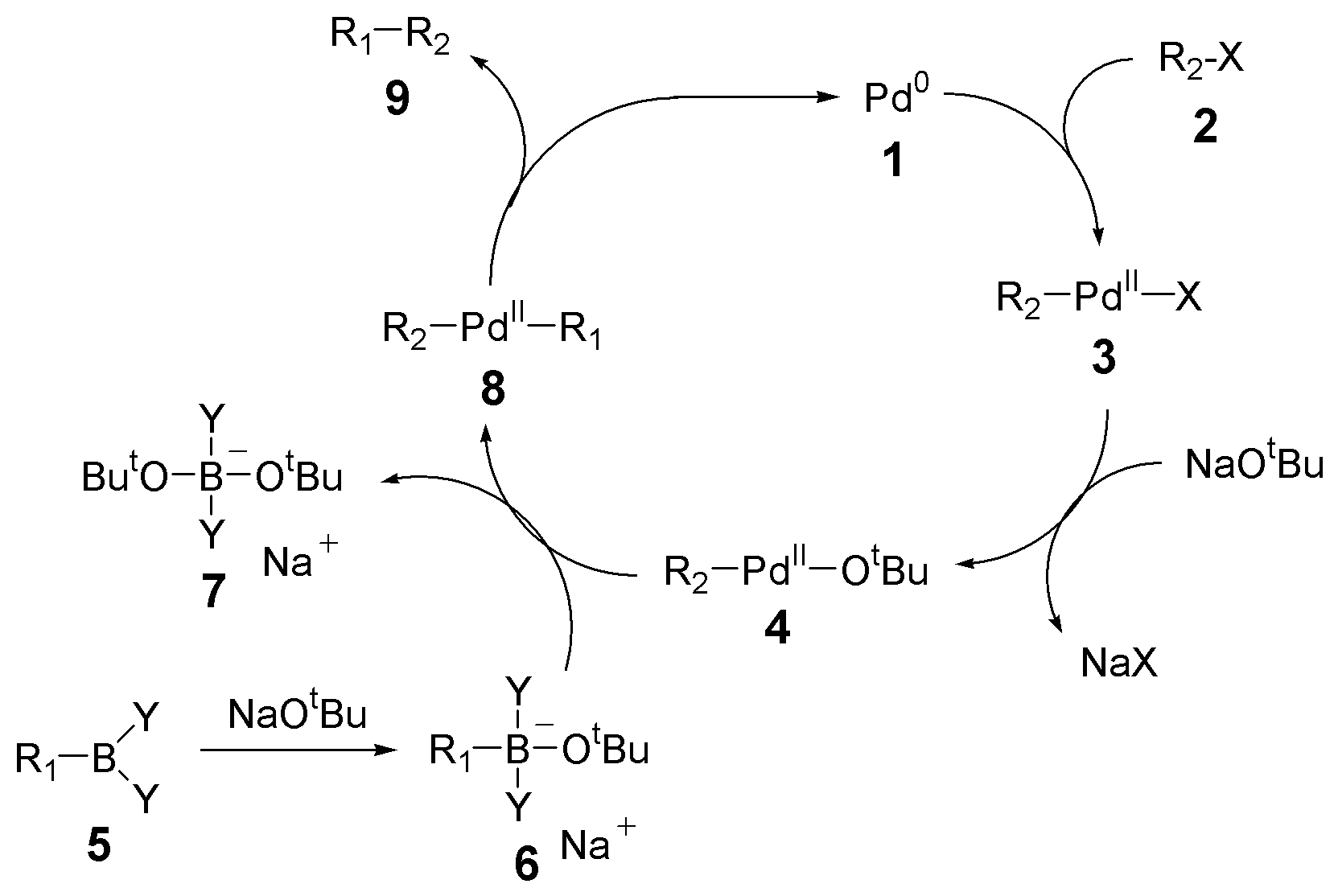
The general mechanism for the Suzuki reaction

Pincer complexes have been shown to catalyse Suzuki–Miyaura coupling reactions, a versatile carbon–carbon bond forming reaction.

Typical Suzuki coupling employ Pd(0) catalysts with monodentate tertiary phosphine ligands (e.g. Pd(PPh_{3})_{4}). It is a very selective method to couple aryl substituents together, but requires elevated temperatures.

Using PCP pincer-palladium catalysts, aryl–aryl couplings can be achieved with turnover numbers (TONs) upwards of 900,000 and high yields. Additionally, other groups have found that very low catalyst loadings can be achieved with asymmetric palladium pincer complexes. Catalyst loadings of 0.0001 mol % have been found to have TONs upwards of 190,000 and upper limit TONs can reach 1,100,000.

=== Sonogashira coupling ===
A general Sonogashira reaction involving an alkyne and aryl or vinyl halide or pseudohalide

Sonogashira coupling has found widespread use in coupling aryl halides with alkynes. TONs upwards of 2,000,000 and low catalyst loadings of 0.005 mol % can be achieved with PNP-based catalysts.

=== Dehydrogenation of alkanes ===
Alkanes undergo dehydrogenation at high temperatures. Typically this conversion is promoted heterogeneously because typically homogeneous catalysts do not survive the required temperatures (~200 °C) The corresponding conversion can be catalyzed homogeneously by pincer catalysts, which are sufficiently thermally robust. Proof of concept was established in 1996 by Jensen and co-workers. They reported that an iridium and rhodium pincer complex catalyze the dehydrogenation of cyclooctane with a turnover frequency of 12 min^{−1} at 200 °C. They found that the dehydrogenation was performed at a rate two orders of magnitude greater than those previously reported. The iridium pincer complex was also found to exhibit higher activity than the rhodium complex. This rate difference may be due to the availability of the Ir(V) oxidation state which allows stronger Ir–C and Ir–H bonds.

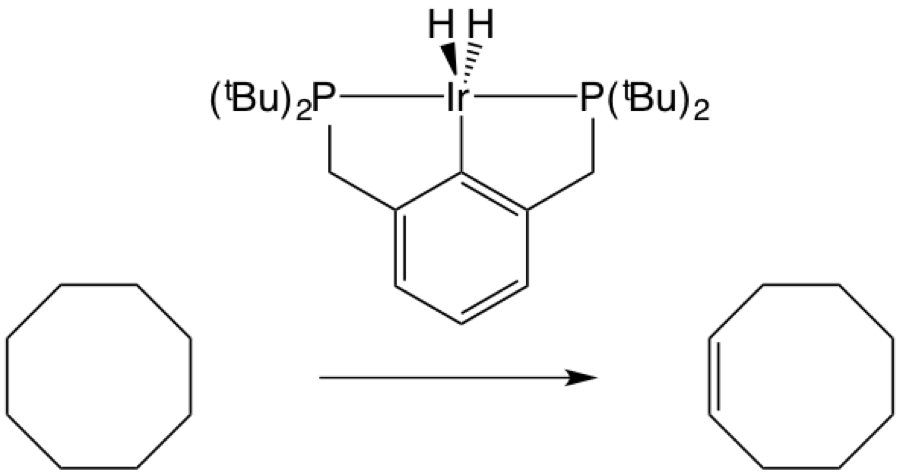
Iridium pincer complex catalyzing the dehydrogenation of cyclooctane to cyclooctene

The homogeneously catalyzed process can be coupled to other reactions such as alkene metathesis. Such tandem reactions have not been demonstrated with heterogeneous catalysts.

== History ==
The original work on PCP ligands arose from studies of the Pt(II) complexes derived from long-chain ditertiary phosphines, species of the type R_{2}P(CH_{2})_{n}PR_{2} where n >4 and R = tert-butyl. Platinum metalates one methylene group with release of HCl, giving species such as PtCl(R_{2}P(CH_{2})_{2}CH(CH_{2})_{2}PR_{2}).

Pincer complexes catalyze the dehydrogenation of alkanes. Early reports described the dehydrogenation of cyclooctane by an Ir pincer complex with a turnover frequency of 12 min^{−1} at 200 °C. The complexes are thermally stable at such temperatures for days.

== See also ==
- Carbene
- Coupling reaction
- Heck reaction
- Kumada coupling
