= Bromoanisole =

Bromoanisole may refer to:

- 2-Bromoanisole
- 3-Bromoanisole
- 4-Bromoanisole
