= Woollins' reagent =

Organic compound

Woollins' Reagent

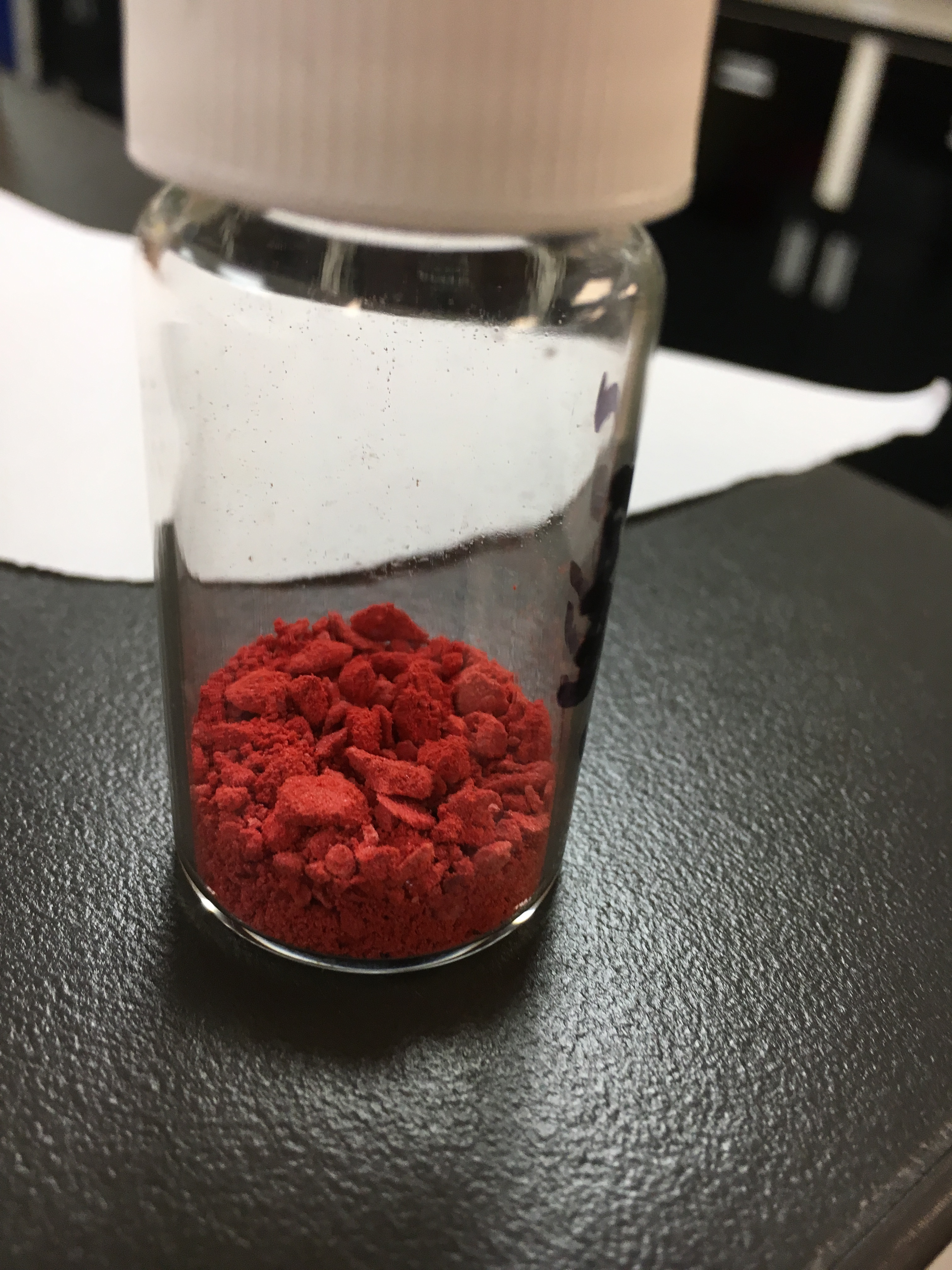

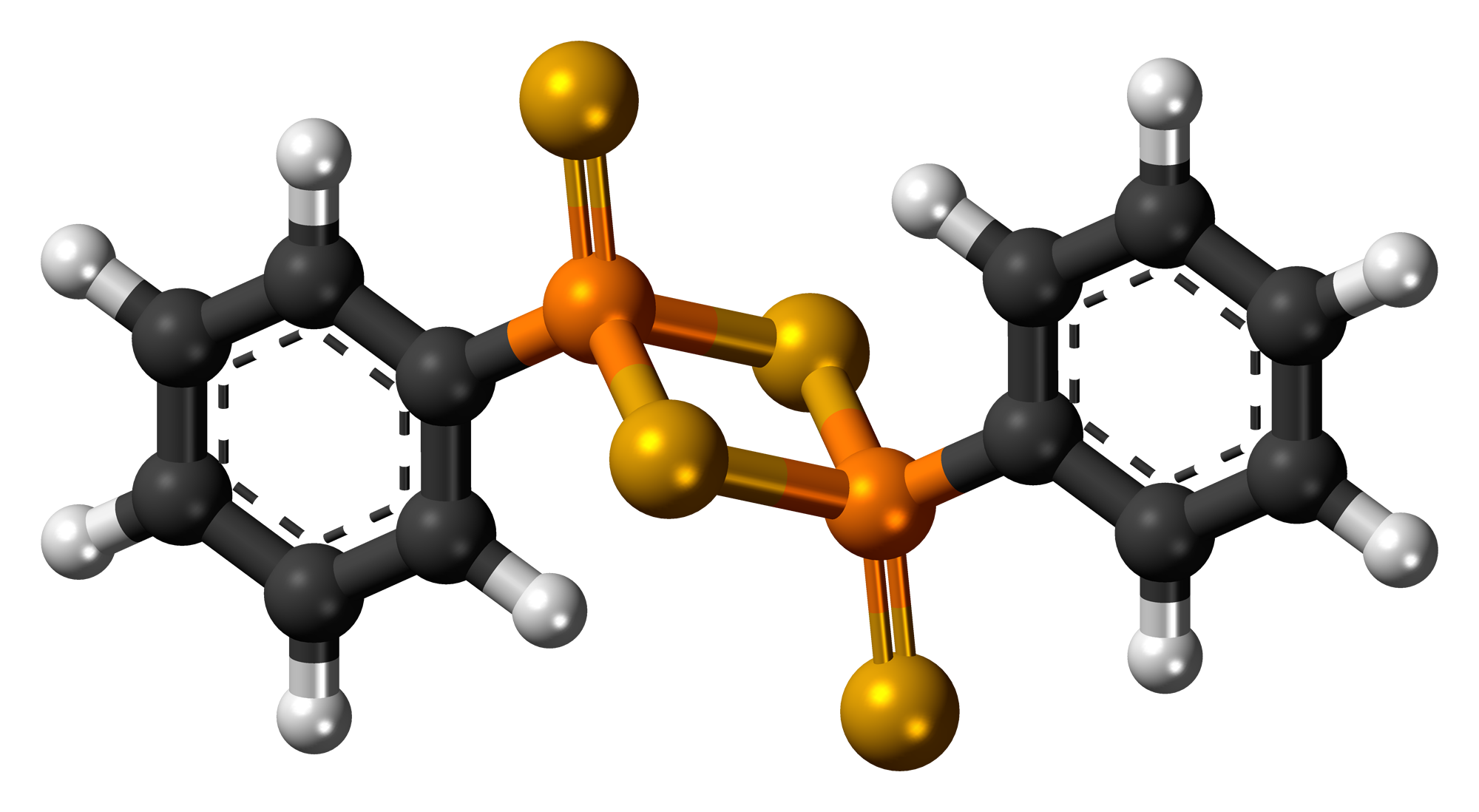

Names
- Preferred IUPAC name 2,4-Diphenyl-1,3,2λ^{5},4λ^{5}-diselenadiphosphetane-2,4-diselone
- Other names Woollins' Reagent

Identifiers
CAS Number	122039-27-4
3D model (JSmol)	Interactive image
ChemSpider	4242993
ECHA InfoCard	100.155.582
EC Number	627-200-6
PubChem CID	5066075
UNII	75551CT912
CompTox Dashboard (EPA)	DTXSID60407970
- InChI: InChI=1S/C12H10P2Se4/c15-13(11-7-3-1-4-8-11)17-14(16,18-13)12-9-5-2-6-10-12/h1-10H Key: GKYFQRQKPYPLGJ-UHFFFAOYSA-N; InChI=1/C12H10P2Se4/c15-13(11-7-3-1-4-8-11)17-14(16,18-13)12-9-5-2-6-10-12/h1-10H Key: GKYFQRQKPYPLGJ-UHFFFAOYAX
- SMILES: c1ccccc1P2(=[Se])[Se]P(=[Se])([Se]2)c3ccccc3

Properties
Chemical formula	C_{12}H_{10}P_{2}Se_{4}
Molar mass	532.044 g·mol^{−1}
Appearance	red powder
Melting point	192 to 204 °C (378 to 399 °F; 465 to 477 K)
Solubility in water	soluble in toluene at elevated temperatures

Hazards
- GHS labelling
Pictograms	(GHS06: Toxic) (GHS08: Health hazard) (GHS09: Environmental hazard)
Signal word	Danger
Hazard statements	H301, H331, H373, H410

Related compounds
- Except where otherwise noted, data are given for materials in their standard state (at 25 °C [77 °F], 100 kPa). verify (what is ?) Infobox references

Woollins' reagent is an organic compound containing phosphorus and selenium. Analogous to Lawesson's reagent, it is used mainly as a selenation reagent. It is named after John Derek Woollins.

== Preparation ==
Woollins' reagent is commercially available. It can also be conveniently prepared in the laboratory by heating a mixture of dichlorophenylphosphine and sodium selenide (Na_{2}Se), (itself prepared from reacting elementary selenium with sodium in liquid ammonia). An alternative synthesis is the reaction of the pentamer (PPh)_{5} (pentaphenylcyclopentaphosphine) with elemental selenium.

== Applications ==
The main use of Woollins' reagent is the selenation of carbonyl compounds. For instance, Woollins' reagent will convert a carbonyl into a selenocarbonyl. Additionally, Woollins' reagent has been used to selenonate carboxylic acids, alkenes, alkynes, and nitriles.
