= Tris(4-methoxyphenyl)phosphine =

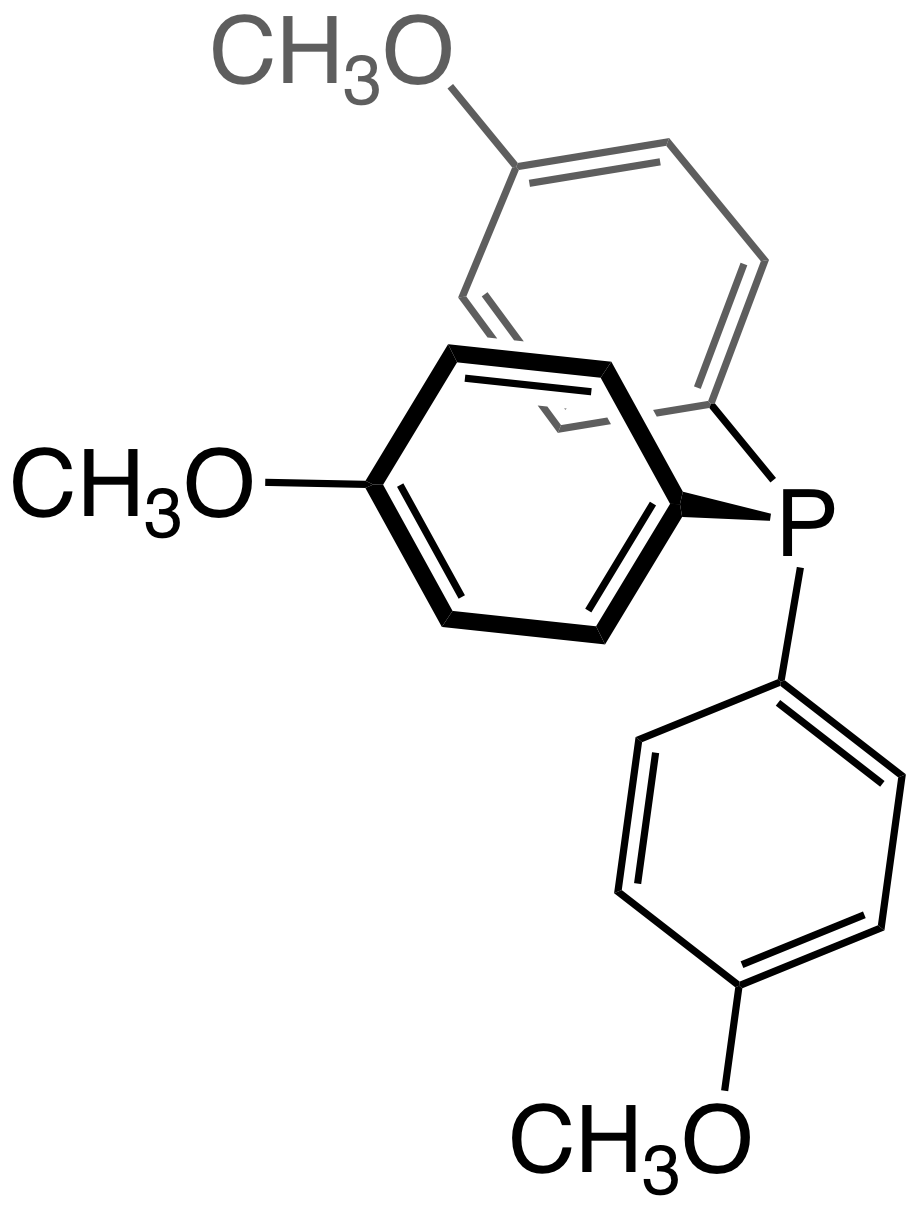

Names
- Preferred IUPAC name Tris(4-methoxyphenyl)phosphane

Identifiers
CAS Number	855-38-9
3D model (JSmol)	Interactive image
ChemSpider	63260
ECHA InfoCard	100.011.567
EC Number	212-723-0
PubChem CID	70071
UNII	PF5BT47LZ8
CompTox Dashboard (EPA)	DTXSID3061217
- InChI: InChI=1S/C21H21O3P/c1-22-16-4-10-19(11-5-16)25(20-12-6-17(23-2)7-13-20)21-14-8-18(24-3)9-15-21/h4-15H,1-3H3 Key: UYUUAUOYLFIRJG-UHFFFAOYSA-N
- SMILES: COC1=CC=C(C=C1)P(C2=CC=C(C=C2)OC)C3=CC=C(C=C3)OC

Properties
Chemical formula	P(C_{6}H_{4}OCH_{3})_{3}
Appearance	white solid
Melting point	131 °C (268 °F; 404 K)

Hazards
- GHS labelling
Pictograms	(GHS07: Exclamation mark)
Signal word	Warning
Hazard statements	H315, H319, H335
Precautionary statements	P261, P264, P271, P280, P302+P352, P304+P340, P305+P351+P338, P312, P321, P332+P313, P337+P313, P362, P403+P233, P405, P501
- Except where otherwise noted, data are given for materials in their standard state (at 25 °C [77 °F], 100 kPa). Infobox references

Tris(4-methoxyphenyl)phosphine is the organophosphorus compound with the formula (CH_{3}OC_{6}H_{4})_{3}P. Several isomers of this formula are known, but the symmetrical derivative with methoxy groups in the 4-position is most studied. The compound is used as a ligand in organometallic chemistry and homogeneous catalysis.

== Related ligands ==
- Triphenylphosphine
- 2-(Diphenylphosphino)anisole
