= Weak-Link Approach =

Supermolecular coordination-based assembly methodology

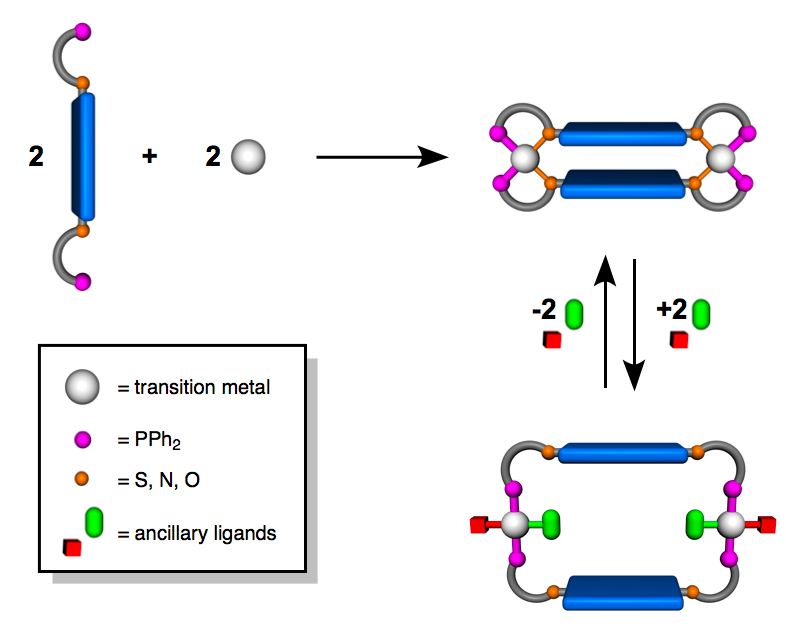
Figure 1. General schematic of the WLA.

The Weak-Link Approach (WLA) is a supramolecular coordination-based assembly methodology, first introduced in 1998 by the Mirkin Group at Northwestern University. This method takes advantage of hemilabile ligands -ligands that contain both strong and weak binding moieties- that can coordinate to metal centers and quantitatively assemble into a single condensed ‘closed’ structure (Figure 1). Unlike other supramolecular assembly methods, the WLA allows for the synthesis of supramolecular complexes that can be modulated from rigid ‘closed’ structures to flexible ‘open’ structures through reversible binding of allosteric effectors at the structural metal centers. The approach is general and has been applied to a variety of metal centers and ligand designs including those with utility in catalysis and allosteric regulation.

== Weak-Link Approach components ==
There are three main components of the WLA methodology that enable the in situ control of supramolecular architecture: 1) the utilization of hemilabile ligands, 2) the choice of metal centers, and 3) the type of allosteric effector.

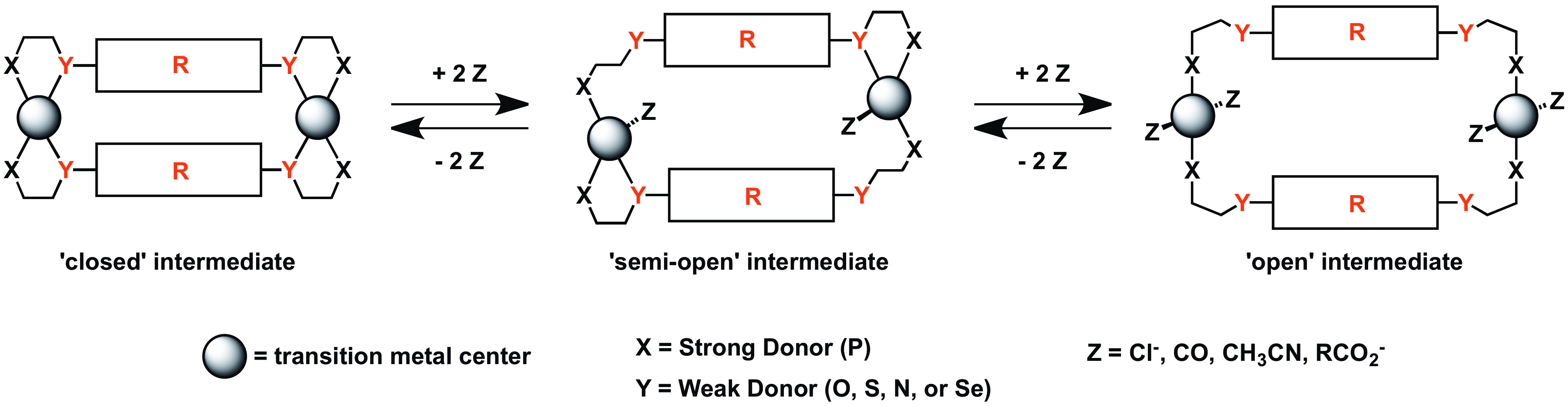
Figure 2. Opening and closing of supramolecular architectures based on the WLA.

=== Hemilabile ligands utilized in the WLA ===
A key component of the WLA is the use of hemilabile ligands. Hemilabile ligands are polydentate chelates that contain at least two different types of bonding groups, denoted X and Y (Figure 2). The first group (X) bonds strongly to the metal center, while the other group (Y) is weakly bonding and easily displaced by coordinating ligands or solvent molecules (Z). In this way, the substitutionally labile group (Y) can be displaced from the metal center yet remain available for recoordination. For WLA-generated structures, a typical ligand design consists of a phosphine-based strong binding group and a weak-binding group containing O, S, Se, or N. More recent reports have utilized N-heterocyclic carbenes (NHC) as the strong-binding moiety. By using a combination of NHC- and phosphine-based hemilabile ligands, heteroligated complexes, and macrocycles have been successfully synthesized, allowing access to more complex architectures with sophisticated functions.

=== Metal centers utilized in the WLA ===
Due to the well-developed understanding of the reactions between the hemilabile ligands and d8 metal ions, the WLA has relied extensively on this type of metal center within its methodology. Initial reports focused on the use of Rh(I), but Ir(I), Ni(II), Pd(II), and Pt(II) have all been successfully employed. While d^{8} metal centers dominate the WLA literature, d^{6} Ru(II) and d^{9} Cu(I) have also been utilized. Importantly, the choice of metal centers tunes the identity and selectivity of the various allosteric effectors.

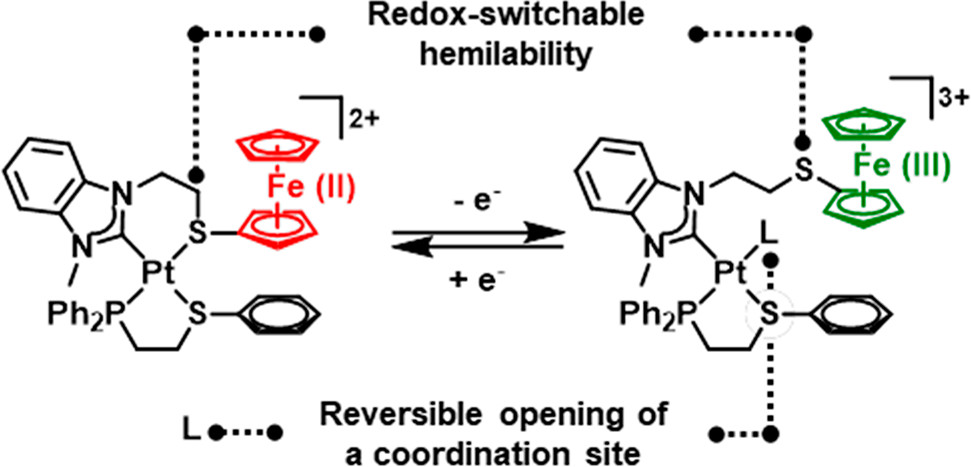
Figure 3. The first WLA complex utilizing redox chemistry as an effector to control reversible binding of ancillary ligands.

=== Types of allosteric effectors in the WLA ===
The use of hemilabile ligands allows structural motifs synthesized via the WLA to be modified with small molecule effectors much like allosteric enzymes in biology. As described above, the weak Y–M bond can be easily displaced by a coordinating ligands including Cl^{−}, CO, CH_{3}CN, RCO_{2}^{−}, and a variety of nitriles/isonitriles (Figure 2). Typical WLA constructs rely on the allosteric effector’s stronger affinity for the metal center versus the weakly binding Y moiety. Upon introduction of these effectors, the closed, rigid structures open to their more flexible form. The closed structures can then be reformed in situ by halide abstraction agents, such as noncoordinating silver and thallium salts, or by evacuation of the reaction chamber to remove solvent or small molecules. Recent progress has shown that the inclusion of pendent redox active transition metal groups in the WLA ligands enables control over the binding of ancillary ligands to a redox-inactive Pt(II) center via oxidation and reduction of the distal metal site (Figure 3). This discovery highlights that new forms of stimuli can be incorporated into the WLA for the design of novel stimuli-responsive materials.

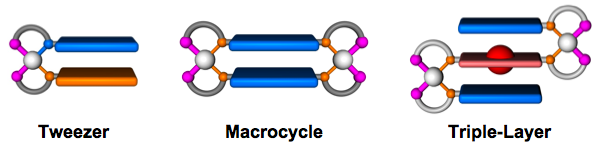
Figure 4. Common architectures that can be assembled with cis-WLA complexes. The grey, pink, and orange spheres represent transition metal ions, strong-binding moieties, and weak-binding moieties, respectively.

== Classes of allosteric structures assembled via the Weak-Link Approach ==
The generality of the WLA and its ability to accommodate a multitude of functional groups has allowed the facile synthesis of both molecular and supramolecular architectures. These structures can be broadly grouped into two classes of compounds based on the coordination geometry of the “closed” complexes: 1) cis-WLA complexes and 2) trans-WLA complexes.

=== cis-WLA complexes ===
The majority of WLA architectures synthesized to date can be classified as cis-WLA complexes. The strong-binding moieties adopt cis-coordination geometry around the metal center in these complexes, regardless of the identities of the strong-binder. For example, the heteroligated complex shown in Figure 3 is understood to be a cis-WLA complex because both the NHC- and phosphino- groups, the strong-binding components, are cis relative to each other. Using these complexes, molecular tweezers, macrocycles, and triple-layer structures have all been successfully synthesized (Figure 4). In 2017, the Mirkin group reported infinite coordination polymer particles incorporating WLA approach complexes. The extended structure was successfully obtained by appending secondary terpyridine groups onto the hemilabile ligands within the WLA subunits and allowing them to selectively bind Fe(II) ions (Figure 5).

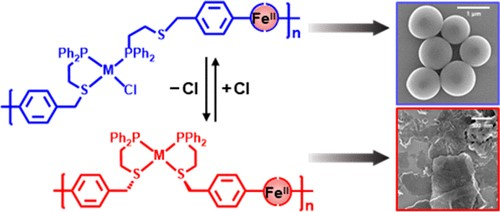
Figure 5. Schematic representation of coordination-based assembly of WLA subunits into infinite coordination polymers (left) and the resulting particle morphology associated with toggling between structural states (right).

=== trans-WLA complexes ===
The first trans-WLA complex was reported by the Mirkin group in 2017. In this complex, two NHC groups adopt a trans-coordination geometry around a Pd(II) metal center due to the addition of the sterically bulky tert-butyl groups to the imidazole ring of the hemilabile ligand. Upon effector binding, a linear change of up to ~9Å was observed (Figure 6). To date, only this molecular complex has been reported utilizing a trans-WLA complex.

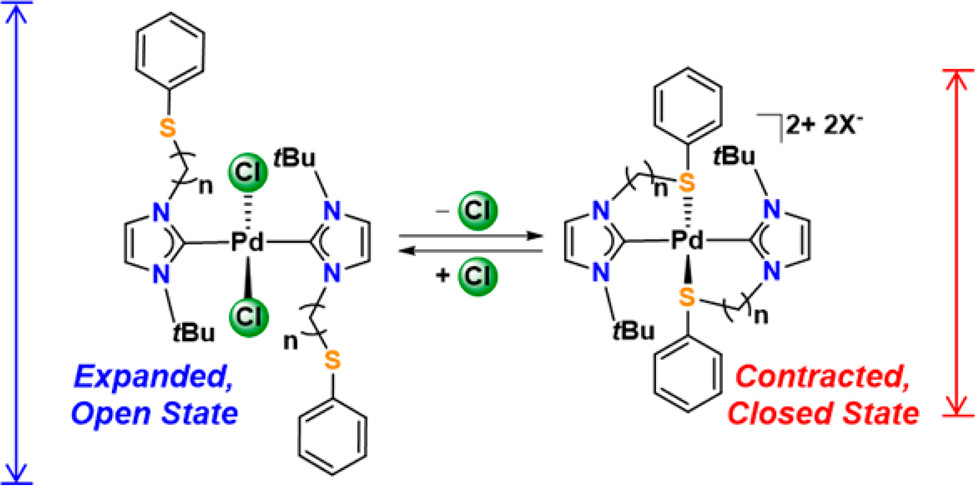
Figure 6. The linear change observed upon chloride binding in a trans-WLA complex.

== Examples of functional allosteric structures ==
Allosteric regulation in supramolecular structures generated via the WLA is particularly important in the context of designing and synthesizing novel, bioinspired catalytic systems, where the conformation of the complex controls the activity of the catalyst. Below are a series of different catalytic motifs that have been constructed via the WLA and a discussion of the control mechanisms that can be used to modulate catalytic activity:

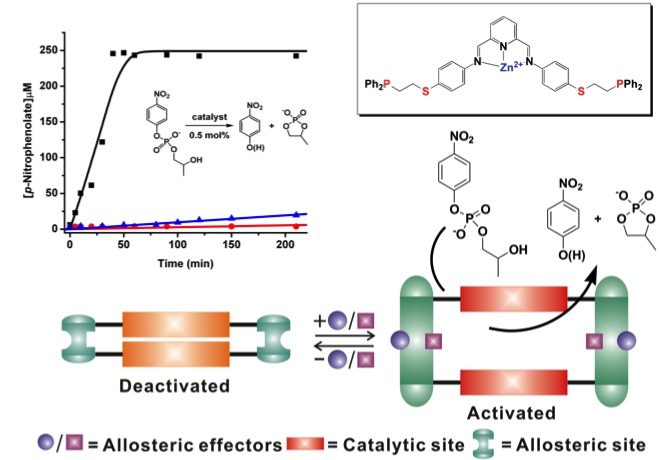
Figure 7. ELISA mimic using a di-Zn(II)-salen macrocycle for transesterification.

=== ELISA mimic ===
The first catalytically active supramolecular structure generated via the WLA was designed to operate via a mechanism inspired by the Enzyme Linked ImmunoSorbent Assay (ELISA). In such a supramolecular system, a target sandwiching event creates a catalyst target complex that subsequently generates chemiluminescent or fluorescent readout. For example, a homologated WLA-based Rh(I) macrocyclic structure has been developed that incorporates pyridine-bisimine Zn(II) moieties and behaves as an efficient and completely reversible allosteric modulator for the hydrolysis of 2-(hydroxypropyl)-p-nitrophenyl phosphate (HPNP), a model substrate for RNA (Figure 7). Significantly, the structural changes induced by small molecule regulators Cl^{−} and CO transition this system from a catalytically inactive state to a very active one in a highly reversible fashion. Further, this system provides a highly sensitive platform for sensing chloride anions. As chloride binds to the Rh(I) centers, the complex is opened, allowing hydrolysis to occur. The hydrolysis product of the reaction (p-nitrophenolate) can be followed by UV-vis spectroscopy. As in ELISA, the WLA-generated mimic can take a small amount of target (chloride anions) and produce a large fluorescent readout that can be utilized for detection.

There are several notable conclusions that can be drawn based on the catalytic studies of this complex. The first is that the closed complex is completely inactive under hydrolysis conditions. Second, the open complex is extremely active and capable of quantitatively hydrolyzing all the HPNP substrate in less than 40 min. By simply bubbling N_{2} into the solution, the reformation of the closed complex and the generation of an inactive catalyst can be achieved.

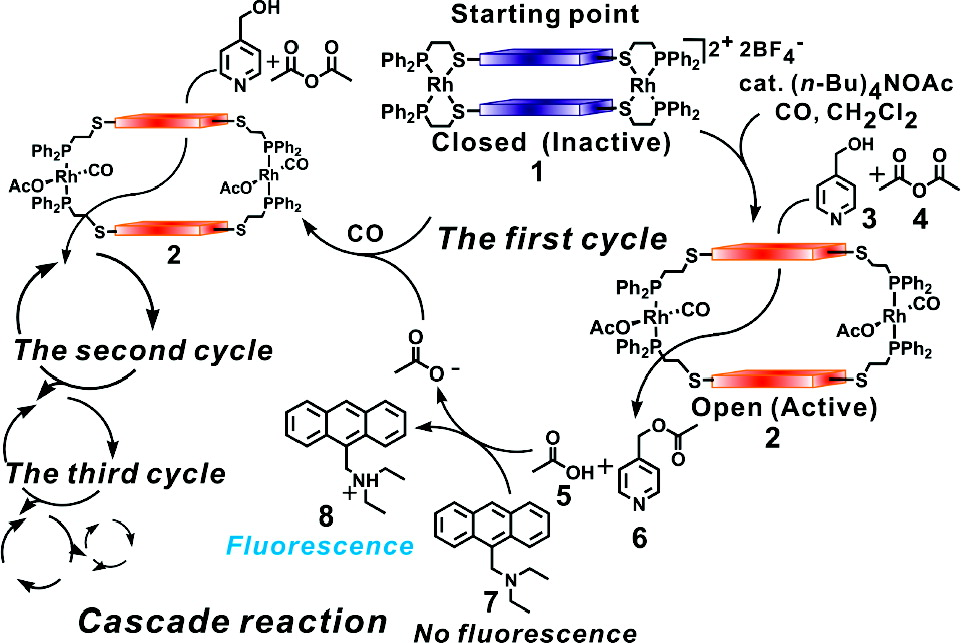
Figure 8. Proposed cascade mechanism for the PCR-mimic in the context of acetate detection.

=== PCR mimic ===
The polymerase chain reaction (PCR) is utilized in biochemistry and molecular biology for exponentially amplifying nucleic acids by making copies of a specific region of a nucleic acid target. When coupled with diagnostic probes, this technique allows one to detect a small collection of molecules under very dilute conditions. A limitation of PCR is that it only works with nucleic acid targets, and there are no known analogues of PCR for other target molecular candidates.

Using the WLA, this type of target amplification approach has been exemplified in an abiotic system. By incorporating Zn(II)-salen ligands into a supramolecular assembly, an acyl transfer reaction involving acetic anhydride and pyridylcarbinol as substrates was investigated. In the absence of acetate, there is almost no catalytic activity. Once a small amount of tetrabutylammonium acetate reacts with inactive complex at its two rhodium centers that serve as structural regulatory sites, it is converted into open cavity complex, which then catalyzes the reaction (Figure 8).

In the early stages of the reaction, only a minor amount of the catalyst is activated. As the reaction proceeds, more acetate is generated, which leads to the formation of more activated complex and progressively faster catalysis. This type of behavior is typical for cascade reactions including PCR. Unlike the previous example in which the catalyst produced a signal amplifier, this catalyst is a target amplifier making more copies of the target acetate. Following the reaction by gas chromatography, one observes that the generation of products follows a sigmoidal curve, indicative of a PCR-like cascade reaction system.

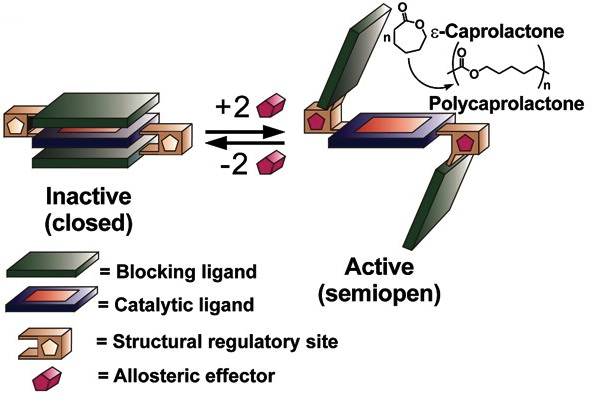
Figure 9. A model of an allosteric supramolecular triple-layer complex for the regulation of the catalytic living polymerization of ε-caprolactone.

=== Triple-layer structure ===
There was also a need to design a catalytic structure that would allow for the inclusion of mono-metallic catalyst that could be completely turned off. To this end the triple-layer motif was developed, composed of two transition metal nodes, two chemically inert blocking exterior layers, and a single catalytically active interior ligand. This complex was synthesized using the WLA and halide induced ligand rearrangement processes, and it can be reversibly activated and deactivated through small-molecule or elemental anion effector reactions that assemble and disassemble the trilayer structures. In a Al(III)-salen example, the polymerization of ε-caprolactone could be turned on and off based on the ancillary ligands and abstraction agents added to the system (Figure 9). Unlike with previous catalytic structures that utilized bimetallic systems, the tri-layer motif allows for the incorporation of a monometallic catalyst, opening the scope of potential catalysts that can be employed using these types of structures.
