= John Derek Woollins =

John Derek Woollins FRSC FRSE
- Education: University of East Anglia
- Known for: Woollins' reagent
- Awards: Royal Society of Chemistry Edward Frankland Fellowship and Main Group Medal
- Scientific career
- Fields: Chemistry
- Workplaces: University of St Andrews; Imperial College London; Loughborough University
- Thesis: Metal complexes containing sulphur-nitrogen ligands (1979)
- Doctoral advisor: Prof Andrew J Thomson and Roger Grinter
- Website: https://risweb.st-andrews.ac.uk/portal/en/persons/j-derek-woollins.html

John Derek Woollins FRSC FRSE is a chemist who was Provost of Khalifa University, Abu Dhabi having previously been Vice Principal (Research and Innovation), Provost of St Leonard's College, at the University of St Andrews. Woollins' reagent is named after him.

He has been a Fellow of the Royal Society of Chemistry since 1994 and a Fellow of the Royal Society of Edinburgh since 2002. Prior to being appointed Vice Principal of Research, Woollins was the Head of Chemistry for two terms. He has been a visiting professor at various institutes.

== Early life and education ==
Woollins grew up in Cleethorpes, the second youngest of four sons. He was educated at Clee Grammar School for Boys, where he attended the sixth form. He then attended the University of East Anglia graduating with a BSc in 1976 and PhD in 1979.

== Career ==
He did postdoc work under William R Cullen at the University of British Columbia in Vancouver, before working with Barnett Rosenberg in Michigan. His work with Rosenberg included work on Cisplatin, an early chemotherapy drug. He came up with a procedure to verify the concentration of transplatin, a harmful isomer, was less than 1ppm. He returned to the United Kingdom where he worked under Norman Greenwood at the University of Leeds before becoming a lecturer at Imperial College London. He became a professor at Loughborough University prior to joining the University of St Andrews. Woollins has been a visiting professor at Australian National University, University of Auckland and most recently Nanjing University of Technology. Initially Woollins was Head of Research of the School of Chemistry at St.Andrews University, before two successful terms as Head of Chemistry. After this he was appointed Vice Principal of Research, a post he held for five years. From September 2019 he became Provost at Khalifa University in Abu Dhabi; he left this post in April 2020.

== Academic Work ==
Professor Derek Woollins is known for his work on the synthesis, determination of structure and applications of new molecules made with main group elements of the Periodic Table, where his work has focused on Sulfur, Selenium and Tellurium. He has also done work on Nitrogen and Phosphorus. Major achievements have been the development of rational synthetic routes, the preparation of molecular systems with unusual structures and properties and the development of main group compounds as reagents for organic chemistry. His work on sulfur-nitrogen rings and cages, as well as selenium and tellurium chemistry, has led to development of new molecular devices including precursors to new single source II-VI semiconductors. His development of imidophosphinate ligands has contributed to possible alternatives to the acidic sulfur-phosphorus reagents dithiophosphinic acids (such as cyanex301) and the thiophosphinic acids (such as cyanex302) which are used as metal extraction agents in ore processing and other sectors where the solvent extraction of metals is needed. So far the extractants such as dithioimidodiphosphinates have not been used widely in industrial processes. Derek's work on phosphorus-sulfur and phosphorus-selenium chemistry resulted in Woollins' reagent that has been manufactured on a commercial scale for use in organic synthesis. Professor Woollins worked on the catalytic removal of hydrogen sulfide from air which is of considerable industrial and environmental significance, and has done a range of work on molecular scaffolding.

Derek Woollins's past PhD students include Ivan Parkin, Stephen M. Aucott, Pravat Bhattacharyya, Paul Kelly, Robin Keyte, Mark Foreman, Tuan Ly and Paul T. Wood. Ivan Parkin, Paul Kelly, Mark Foreman and Paul Wood are working as academics at UCL, Loughborough, Chalmers and Cambridge universities respectively.

== Awards ==
Woollins has received various awards for his work. In 1990 he was awarded the Sir Edward Franklin award by the Royal Society of Chemistry for his work on Organometallic chemistry. In 1997 the Royal Society of Chemistry again recognized Woollins' contribution by awarding him the Main Group Metals medal, for his contributions to Sulfur Chemistry.

== Published works ==
He has written several books on chemistry, the most popular of which is Inorganic Experiments, first published in 1994 and which has four editions to date. He has also worked as an editor of many other books. Woollins has over 500 papers published. A Web of Science search in December 2020 indicates that he has published 579 papers. He has an h-index of 53 according to Google Scholar.
