= 2-Bromoanisole =

Names
- Preferred IUPAC name 1-Bromo-2-methoxybenzene

Identifiers
CAS Number	578-57-4
3D model (JSmol)	Interactive image
ChemSpider	13881329
ECHA InfoCard	100.008.570
EC Number	209-425-8
PubChem CID	11358
UNII	X3XAZ6R3FL
CompTox Dashboard (EPA)	DTXSID4060367
- InChI: InChI=1S/C7H7BrO/c1-9-7-5-3-2-4-6(7)8/h2-5H,1H3 Key: HTDQSWDEWGSAMN-UHFFFAOYSA-N
- SMILES: COC1=CC=CC=C1Br

Properties
Chemical formula	C_{7}H_{7}BrO
Molar mass	187.036 g·mol^{−1}
Appearance	Colorless liquid
Melting point	2.5 °C (36.5 °F; 275.6 K)
Boiling point	216 °C (421 °F; 489 K)

Hazards
- GHS labelling
Pictograms	(GHS09: Environmental hazard)
Signal word	Warning
Hazard statements	H411
Precautionary statements	P273, P391, P501
- Except where otherwise noted, data are given for materials in their standard state (at 25 °C [77 °F], 100 kPa). Infobox references

2-Bromoanisole is an organobromide with the formula BrC_{6}H_{4}OCH_{3}. A colorless liquid, it is one of three isomers of bromoanisole, the others being 3-bromoanisole and 4-bromoanisole. It is a standard coupling partner in metal catalyzed coupling reactions. These reactions include Heck reactions, Buchwald-Hartwig coupling, Suzuki couplings, and Ullmann condensations. The corresponding Grignard reagent readily forms. It is a precursor to o-anisaldehyde.
