= Anisole =

Organic compound (CH3OC6H5) also named methoxybenzene

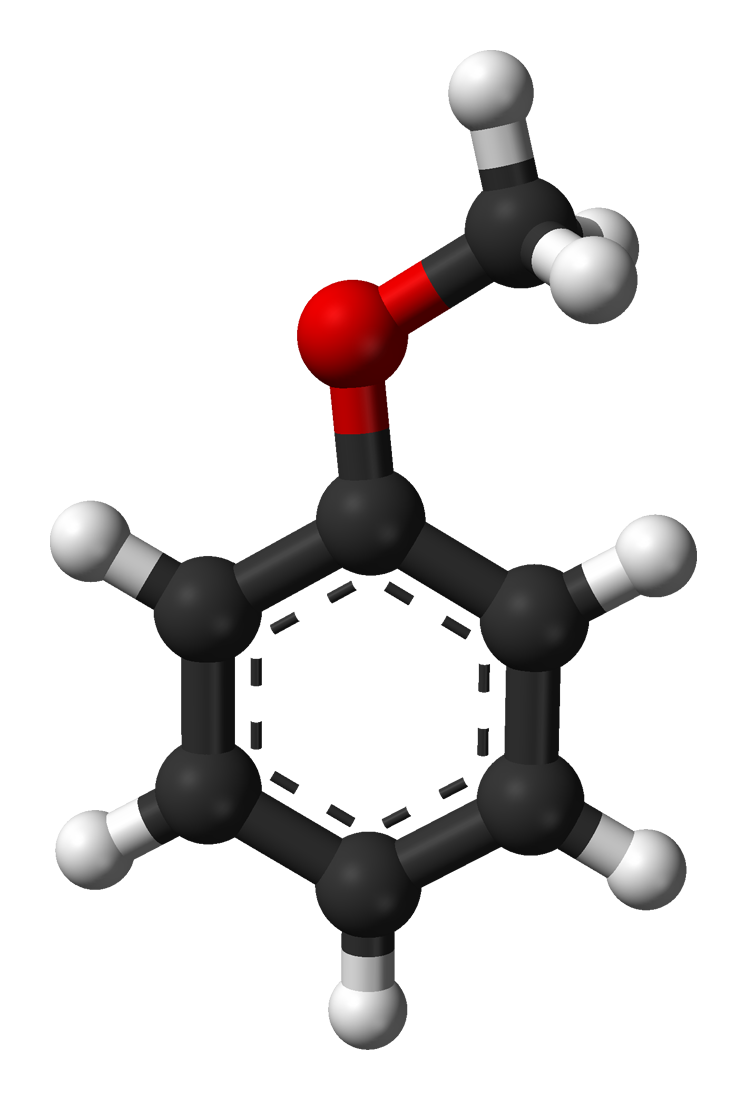

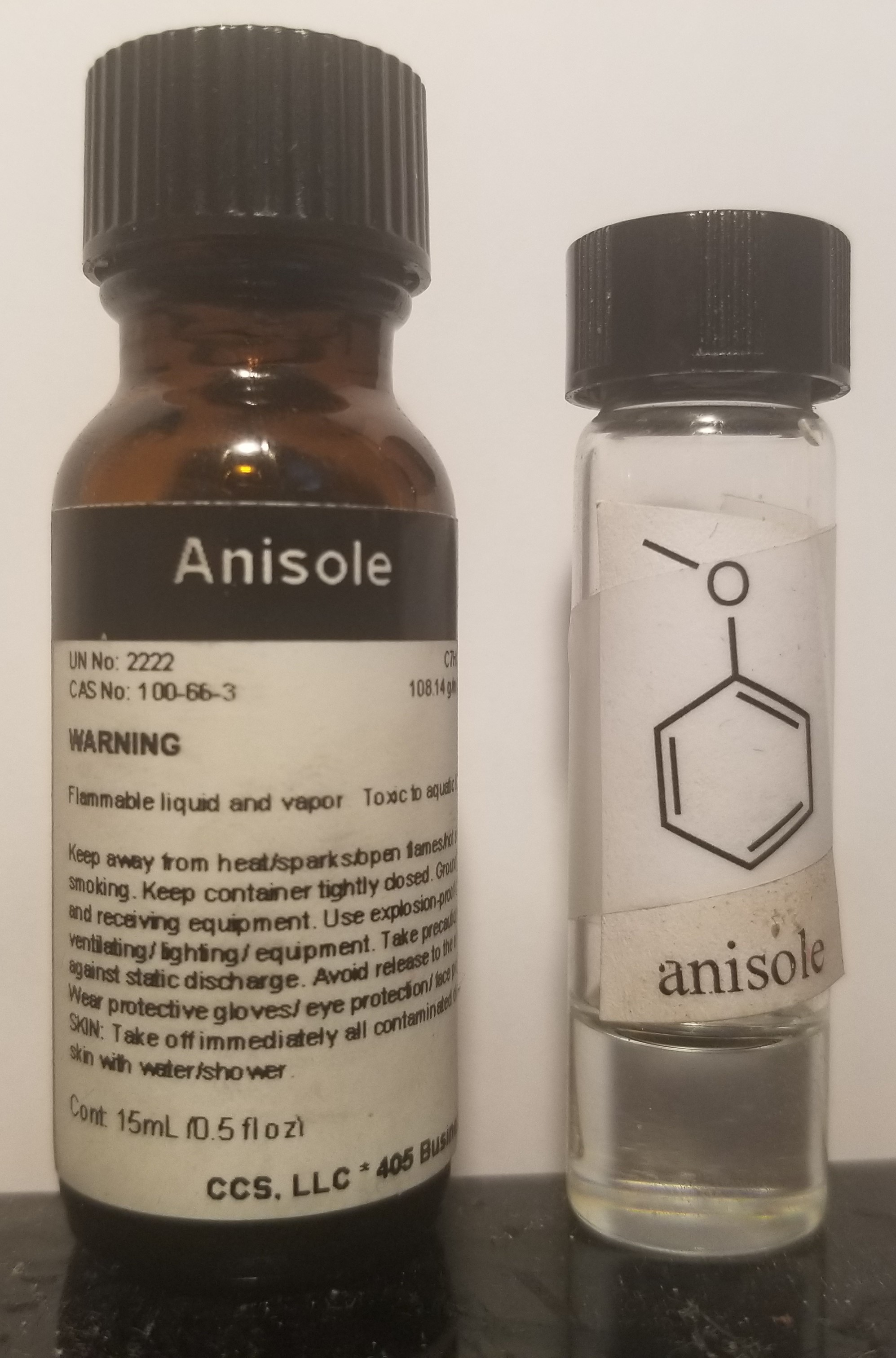

Names
- Preferred IUPAC name Anisole
- Systematic IUPAC name Methoxybenzene
- Other names Methyl phenyl ether Phenoxymethane

Identifiers
CAS Number	100-66-3
3D model (JSmol)	Interactive image
Abbreviations	PhOMe; MeOPh
Beilstein Reference	506892
ChEBI	CHEBI:16579
ChEMBL	ChEMBL278024
ChemSpider	7238
ECHA InfoCard	100.002.615
EC Number	202-876-1
Gmelin Reference	2964
KEGG	C01403
PubChem CID	7519
RTECS number	BZ8050000
UNII	B3W693GAZH
UN number	2222
CompTox Dashboard (EPA)	DTXSID4041608
- InChI: InChI=1S/C7H8O/c1-8-7-5-3-2-4-6-7/h2-6H,1H3 Key: RDOXTESZEPMUJZ-UHFFFAOYSA-N; InChI=1/C7H8O/c1-8-7-5-3-2-4-6-7/h2-6H,1H3 Key: RDOXTESZEPMUJZ-UHFFFAOYAP
- SMILES: COc1ccccc1

Properties
Chemical formula	C_{7}H_{8}O
Molar mass	108.140 g·mol^{−1}
Appearance	Colorless liquid
Density	0.995 g/cm^{3}
Melting point	−37 °C (−35 °F; 236 K)
Boiling point	154 °C (309 °F; 427 K)
Solubility	Insoluble
Magnetic susceptibility (χ)	−72.79×10^{−6} cm^{3}/mol

Hazards
- GHS labelling
Pictograms	(GHS02: Flammable) (GHS07: Exclamation mark)
Signal word	Warning
Hazard statements	H226, H315, H319
Precautionary statements	P210, P233, P240, P241, P242, P243, P264, P280, P302+P352, P303+P361+P353, P305+P351+P338, P321, P332+P313, P337+P313, P362, P370+P378, P403+P235, P501
NFPA 704 (fire diamond)	1 2 0
- Lethal dose or concentration (LD, LC)
LD_{50} (median dose)	3700 mg/kg (rat, oral)
- Except where otherwise noted, data are given for materials in their standard state (at 25 °C [77 °F], 100 kPa). verify (what is ?) Infobox references

Anisole, or methoxybenzene, is an organic compound with the formula CH_{3}OC_{6}H_{5}. It is a colorless liquid with a smell reminiscent of anise seed, and in fact many of its derivatives are found in natural and artificial fragrances. The compound is mainly made synthetically and is a precursor to other synthetic compounds. Structurally, it is an ether (−O−) with a methyl (−CH_{3}) and phenyl (−C_{6}H_{5}) group attached. Anisole is a standard reagent of both practical and pedagogical value.

== Reactivity ==
Anisole undergoes electrophilic aromatic substitution reaction at a faster speed than benzene, which in turn reacts more quickly than nitrobenzene. The methoxy group is an ortho/para directing group, which means that electrophilic substitution preferentially occurs at these three sites. The enhanced nucleophilicity of anisole vs. benzene reflects the influence of the methoxy group, which renders the ring more electron-rich. The methoxy group strongly affects the pi cloud of the ring as a mesomeric electron donor, more so than as an inductive electron withdrawing group despite the electronegativity of the oxygen. Stated more quantitatively, the Hammett constant for para-substitution of anisole is –0.27.

Illustrative of its nucleophilicity, anisole reacts with acetic anhydride to give 4-methoxyacetophenone:

CH_{3}OC_{6}H_{5} + (CH_{3}CO)_{2}O → CH_{3}OC_{6}H_{4}C(O)CH_{3} + CH_{3}CO_{2}H

Unlike most acetophenones, but reflecting the influence of the methoxy group, methoxyacetophenone undergoes a second acetylation. Many related reactions have been demonstrated. For example, phosphorus pentasulfide (P_{4}S_{10}) converts anisole to Lawesson's reagent, [(CH_{3}OC_{6}H_{4})PS_{2}]_{2}.

Also indicating an electron-rich ring, anisole readily forms π-complexes with metal carbonyls, e.g. Cr(η^{6}-anisole)(CO)_{3}.

The ether linkage is highly stable, but the methyl group can be removed with strong acids, such as hydroiodic acid or boron trichloride:

CH_{3}OC_{6}H_{5} + HI → HOC_{6}H_{5} + CH_{3}I

Birch reduction of anisole gives 1-methoxycyclohexa-1,4-diene.

== Synthesis ==
Anisole was first synthesized in 1841 by Auguste Cahours by barium anisate decarboxylation while heating p-anisic acid he made earlier from the anise essence with barium oxide:

2 CH_{3}OC_{6}H_{4}COOH + BaO → (CH_{3}OC_{6}H_{4}COO)_{2}Ba + H_{2}O

(CH_{3}OC_{6}H_{4}COO)_{2}Ba → 2 CH_{3}OC_{6}H_{5} + BaCO_{3}

It can be prepared by the Williamson ether synthesis from sodium phenoxide and dimethyl sulfate or methyl chloride:

2 C_{6}H_{5}O^{−} Na^{+} + (CH_{3}O)_{2}SO_{2} → 2 C_{6}H_{5}OCH_{3} + Na_{2}SO_{4}

== Applications ==
Anisole is a precursor to perfumes, insect pheromones, and pharmaceuticals. For example, synthetic anethole is prepared from anisole.

== Safety ==
Anisole is relatively nontoxic with an LD_{50} of 3700 mg/kg in rats. Its main hazard is its flammability. For comparison, table salt is somewhat more toxic, with an LD_{50} of 3000 mg/kg, and ethanol (drinking alcohol) is roughly half as toxic, with an LD_{50} of 7060 mg/kg.

== Popular culture ==
In the board game Scrabble, the word "anisole" is the 39th-most-likely word (out of over 25,000 possibilities) for a "bingo"/"bonus", i.e. the deployment of all seven letters in one's own hand simultaneously.

== See also ==
- Anethole
- Bromoanisole
- Butylated hydroxyanisole
- Ether
- Ethyl phenyl ether
- Phenol
- 2,4,6-Trichloroanisole (cork taint)
