= Lawesson's reagent =

- Lawesson's reagent

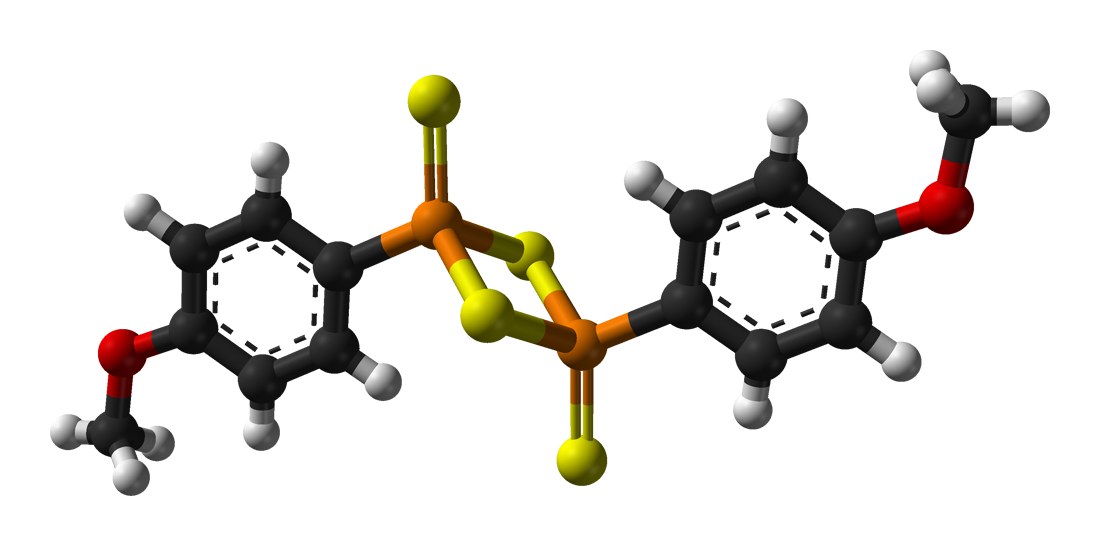
- 3D model of the Lawesson's reagent molecule

Names
- IUPAC name 2,4-Bis(4-methoxyphenyl)-1,3,2,4-dithiadiphosphetane-2,4-disulfide
- Preferred IUPAC name 2,4-Bis(4-methoxyphenyl)-1,3,2,4-dithiadiphosphetane-2,4-dithione
- Other names Lawesson reagent; LR

Identifiers
CAS Number	19172-47-5
3D model (JSmol)	Interactive image
ChemSpider	79346
ECHA InfoCard	100.038.944
EC Number	242-855-4
PubChem CID	87949
UNII	A4125MQ8RX
CompTox Dashboard (EPA)	DTXSID4066460
- InChI: InChI=1S/C14H14O2P2S4/c1-15-11-3-7-13(8-4-11)17(19)21-18(20,22-17)14-9-5-12(16-2)6-10-14/h3-10H,1-2H3 Key: CFHGBZLNZZVTAY-UHFFFAOYSA-N; InChI=1/C14H14O2P2S4/c1-15-11-3-7-13(8-4-11)17(19)21-18(20,22-17)14-9-5-12(16-2)6-10-14/h3-10H,1-2H3 Key: CFHGBZLNZZVTAY-UHFFFAOYAB
- SMILES: S=P1(SP(=S)(S1)c2ccc(OC)cc2)c3ccc(OC)cc3

Properties
Chemical formula	C_{14}H_{14}O_{2}P_{2}S_{4}
Molar mass	404.45 g·mol^{−1}
Appearance	Slightly yellow powder
Melting point	228–231 °C (442–448 °F; 501–504 K)
Solubility in water	Insoluble

Hazards
- GHS labelling
Pictograms	(GHS02: Flammable) (GHS07: Exclamation mark)
Signal word	Warning
Hazard statements	H261, H302, H312, H332
Precautionary statements	P231+P232, P261, P264, P270, P271, P280, P301+P312, P302+P352, P304+P312, P304+P340, P312, P322, P330, P363, P370+P378, P402+P404, P501

Related compounds
Related thiation agents	Hydrogen sulfide, Phosphorus pentasulfide
- Except where otherwise noted, data are given for materials in their standard state (at 25 °C [77 °F], 100 kPa). verify (what is ?) Infobox references

Lawesson's reagent (LR) is a chemical compound used in organic synthesis as a thiation agent. Lawesson's reagent was first made popular by Sven-Olov Lawesson, who did not, however, invent it. Lawesson's reagent was first made in 1956 during a systematic study of the reactions of arenes with P_{4}S_{10}.

== Preparation ==
Lawesson's reagent is commercially available. It can also be conveniently prepared in the laboratory by heating a mixture of anisole with phosphorus pentasulfide until the mixture is clear and no more hydrogen sulfide is formed, then recrystallized from toluene or xylene.

Samples give a strong odor of hydrogen sulfide owing to partial hydrolysis. One common and effective method of destroying the foul smelling residues is to use an excess of sodium hypochlorite (chlorine bleach).

== Mechanism of action ==
Lawesson's reagent has a four membered ring of alternating sulfur and phosphorus atoms. The central phosphorus/sulfur four-membered ring dissociates to form two reactive dithiophosphine ylides (R-PS_{2}). Much of the chemistry of Lawessons's reagent is in fact the chemistry of this reactive intermediate.

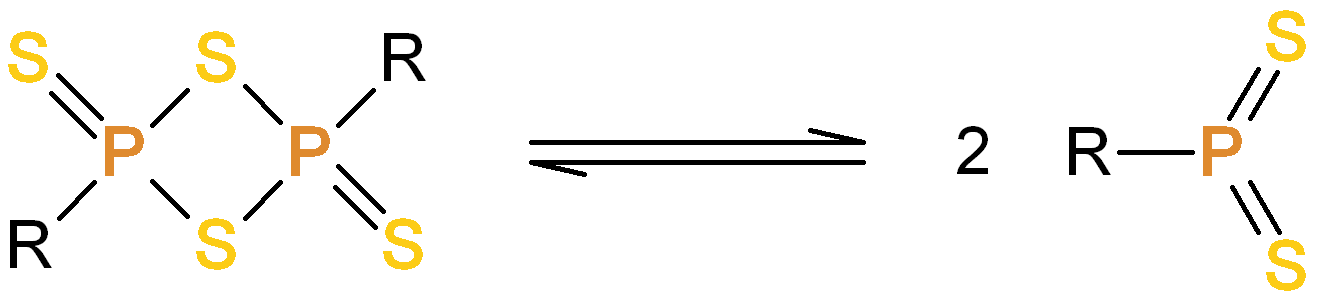

In general, the more electron rich a carbonyl is, the faster the carbonyl group will be converted into the corresponding thiocarbonyl by Lawesson's reagent.

== Applications ==
The chemistry of Lawesson's reagent and related substances has been reviewed several times. The main use of Lawesson's reagent is the thionation of carbonyl compounds. For instance, Lawesson's reagent will convert a carbonyl into a thiocarbonyl. Additionally, Lawesson's reagent has been used to thionate enones, esters, lactones, amides, lactams, and quinones.

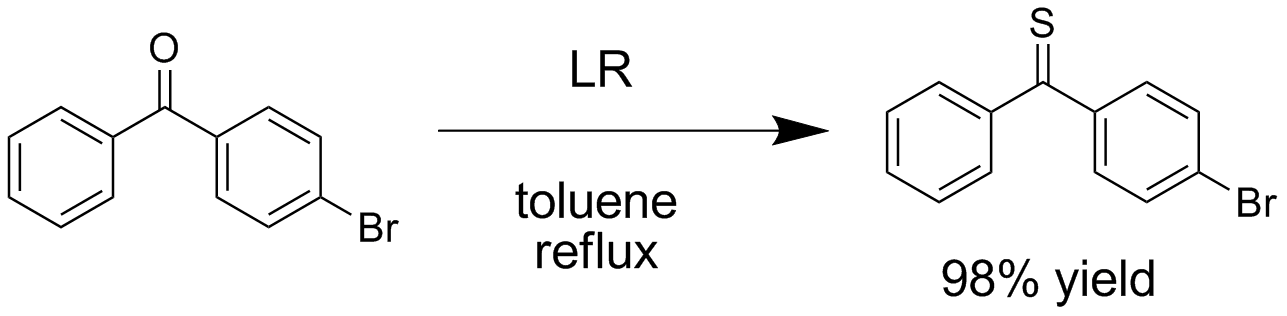

In one study, reaction of maltol with LR results in a selective oxygen replacement in two positions.

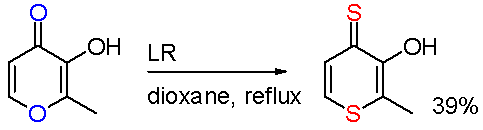

A combination of silver perchlorate and Lawesson's reagent is able to act as an oxophilic Lewis acid with the ability to catalyze the Diels–Alder reaction of dienes with α,β-unsaturated aldehydes.

In some cases, alcohols may be converted to thiols by treatment with Lawesson's reagent.

Lawesson's reagent reacts with sulfoxides to form thioethers.

== See also ==
- Woollins' reagent
