= P-Chiral phosphine =

Chemical compound

Two P-chiral "Kwon phosphines".

P-Chiral phosphines are organophosphorus compounds of the formula PRR′R″, where R, R′, R″ = H, alkyl, aryl, etc. They are a subset of chiral phosphines, a broader class of compounds where the stereogenic center can reside at sites other than phosphorus. P-chirality exploits the high barrier for inversion of phosphines, which ensures that enantiomers of PRR'R" do not racemize readily. The inversion barrier is relatively insensitive to substituents for triorganophosphines. By contrast, most amines of the type NRR′R″ undergo rapid pyramidal inversion.

== Research themes ==
Most chiral phosphines are C_{2}-symmetric diphosphines. Famous examples are DIPAMP and BINAP. These chelating ligands support catalysts used in asymmetric hydrogenation and related reactions. DIPAMP is prepared by coupling the P-chiral methylphenylanisylphosphine.

P-Chiral phosphines are of particular interest in asymmetric catalysis. P-Chiral phosphines have been investigated for two main applications, as ligands for asymmetric homogeneous catalysts and as nucleophiles in organocatalysis.
