= Pyramidal inversion =

Fluxional process in trigonal-pyramidal molecules

⇌
Nitrogen inversion: The amine C_{3} axis is horizontal; the pair of dots represent the lone pair (on that axis). Note that the two amine molecules are symmetric across a mirror plane. If the three R groups attached are all unique, then the amine is chiral; isolability depends on the free energy required to invert the molecule.

In chemistry, pyramidal inversion (also umbrella inversion) is a fluxional process in which compounds with a pyramidal molecule, such as ammonia (NH_{3}) "turns inside out". It is a rapid oscillation of the atom and substituents, the molecule or ion passing through a planar transition state. For a compound that would otherwise be chiral due to a stereocenter, pyramidal inversion allows its enantiomers to racemize. The general phenomenon of pyramidal inversion applies to many types of molecules, including carbanions, amines, phosphines, arsines, stibines, and sulfoxides.

== Energy barrier ==
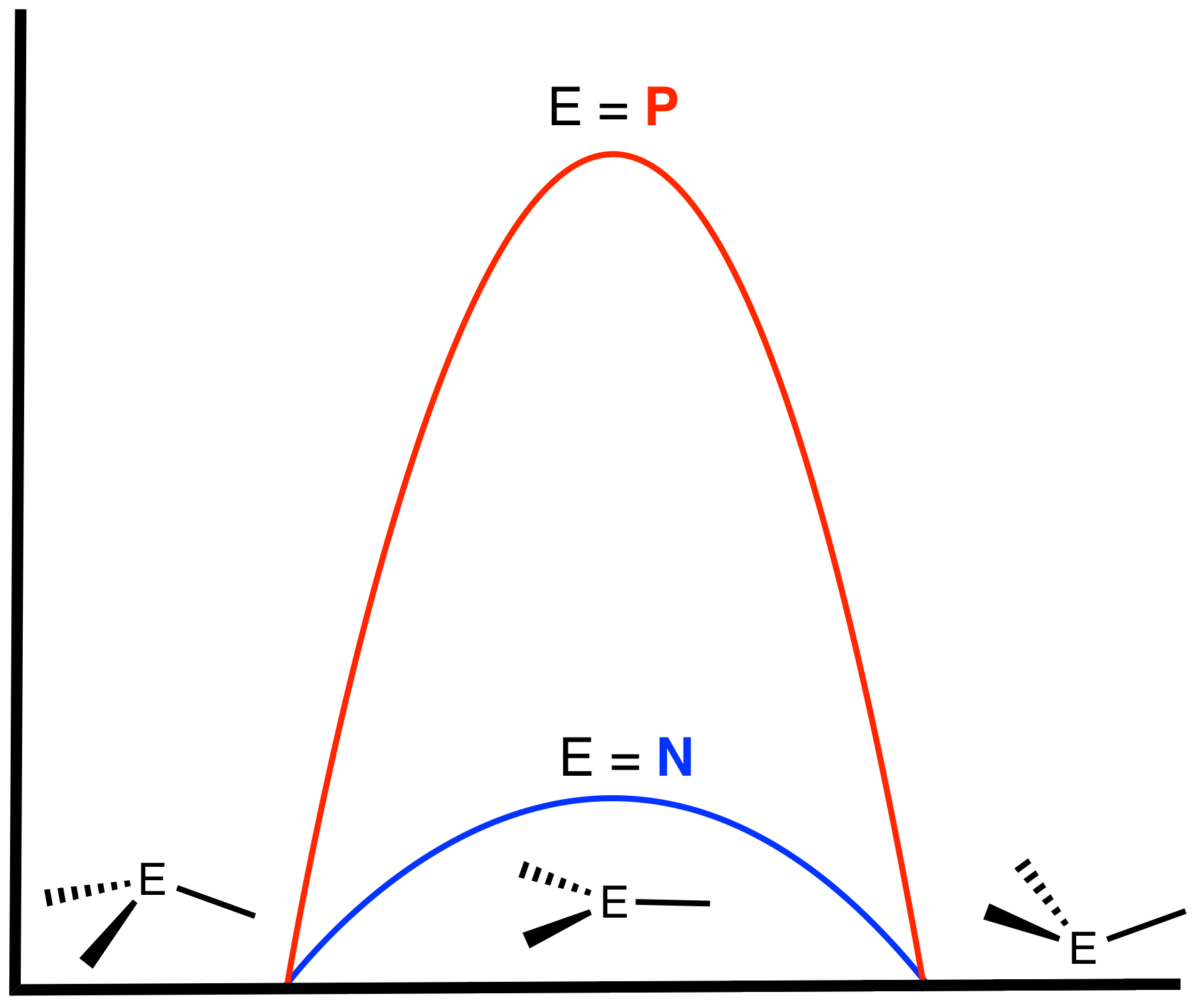
Qualitative reaction coordinate for inversion of an amine and a phosphine. The y-axis is energy.

The identity of the inverting atom has a dominating influence on the barrier. Inversion of ammonia is rapid at room temperature, inverting 30 billion times per second. Three factors contribute to the rapidity of the inversion: a low energy barrier (24.2 kJ/mol; 5.8 kcal/mol), a narrow barrier width (distance between geometries), and the low mass of hydrogen atoms, which combine to give a further 80-fold rate enhancement due to quantum tunnelling. In contrast, phosphine (PH_{3}) inverts very slowly at room temperature (energy barrier: 132 kJ/mol). Consequently, amines of the type RR′R″N usually are not optically stable (enantiomers racemize rapidly at room temperature), but P-chiral phosphines are. Appropriately substituted sulfonium salts, sulfoxides, arsines, etc. are also optically stable near room temperature. Steric effects can also influence the barrier.

== Nitrogen inversion ==
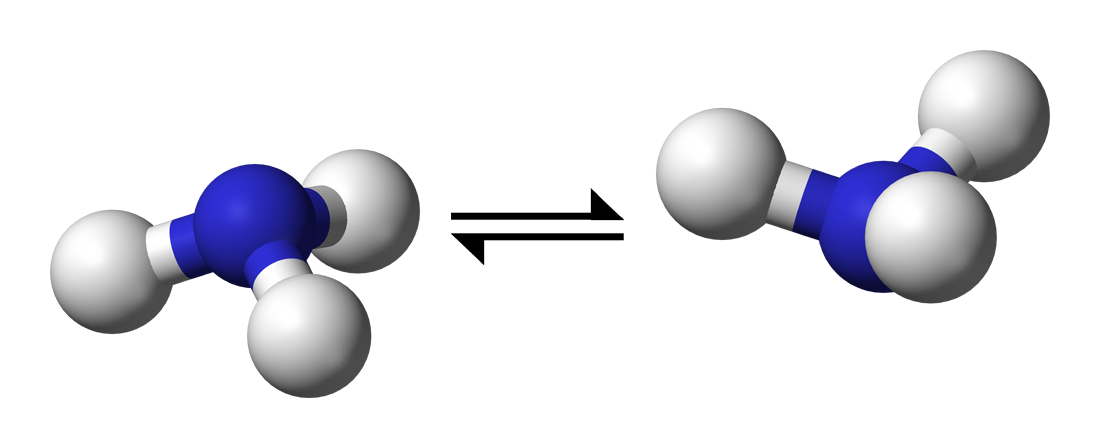
Nitrogen inversion in ammonia

Pyramidal inversion in nitrogen and amines is known as nitrogen inversion. It is a rapid oscillation of the nitrogen atom and substituents, the nitrogen "moving" through the plane formed by the substituents (although the substituents also move - in the other direction); the molecule passing through a planar transition state. For a compound that would otherwise be chiral due to a nitrogen stereocenter, nitrogen inversion provides a low energy pathway for racemization, usually making chiral resolution impossible.

=== Quantum effects ===
Ammonia exhibits a quantum tunnelling due to a narrow tunneling barrier, and not due to thermal excitation. Superposition of two states leads to energy level splitting, which is used in ammonia masers.

=== Examples ===
The inversion of ammonia was first detected by microwave spectroscopy in 1934.

In one study the inversion in an aziridine was slowed by a factor of 50 by placing the nitrogen atom in the vicinity of a phenolic alcohol group compared to the oxidized hydroquinone.

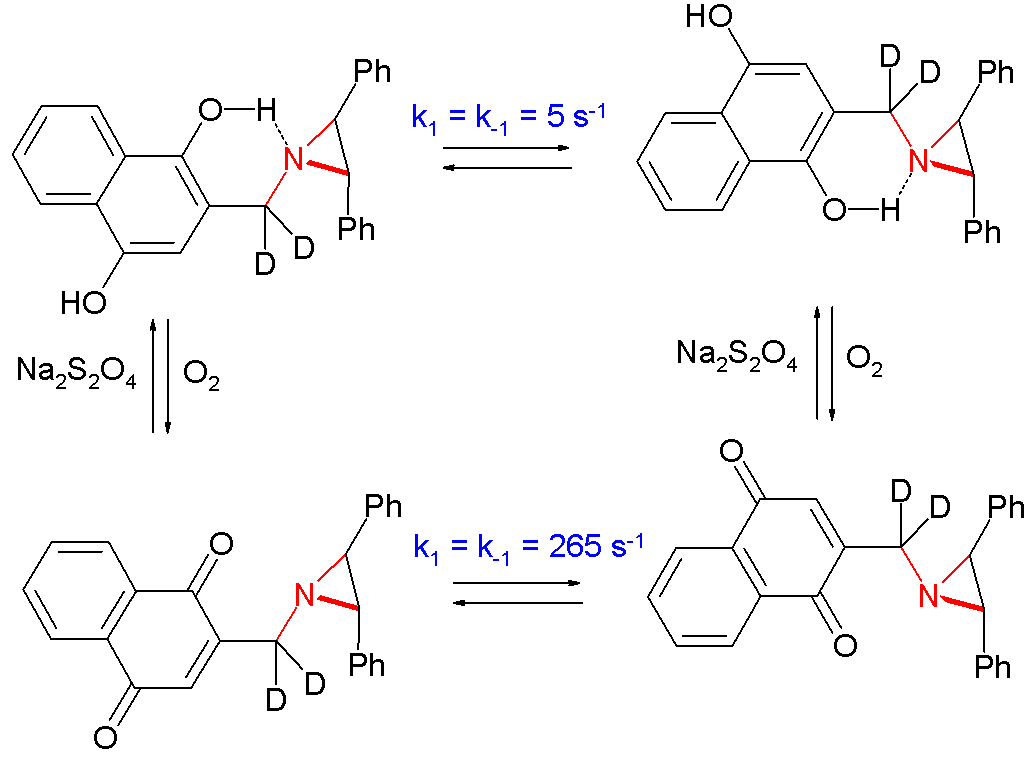
Nitrogen inversion Davies 2006

The system interconverts by oxidation by oxygen and reduction by sodium dithionite.

=== Exceptions ===
rigid Tröger's base scaffold prevents nitrogen inversion

Conformational strain and structural rigidity can effectively prevent the inversion of amine groups. Tröger's base analogs (including Hünlich's base) are examples of compounds whose nitrogen atoms are chirally stable stereocenters and therefore have significant optical activity.
