= DIOP =

Names
- IUPAC name O-Isopropylidene-2,3-dihydroxy-1,4-bis(diphenylphosphino)butane
- Preferred IUPAC name {[(4R,5R)-2,2-Dimethyl-1,3-dioxolane-4,5-diyl]bis(methylene)}bis(diphenylphosphane)
- Other names (−)-2,3-O-Isopropylidene-2,3-dihydroxy-1,4-bis(diphenylphosphino)butane (−)-1,4-Bis(diphenylphosphino)-1,4-dideoxy-2,3-O-isopropylidene-L-threitol (+)-2,3-O-Isopropylidene-2,3-dihydroxy-1,4-bis(diphenylphosphino)butane (+)-1,4-Bis(diphenylphosphino)-1,4-dideoxy-2,3-O-isopropylidene-L-threitol

Identifiers
| CAS Number | 32305-98-9 (–); 37002-48-5 (+) |
| 3D model (JSmol) | (–): Interactive image |
| ChemSpider | 350240 (–) |
| PubChem CID | 395120 (–) |
| UNII | ESK57W53CI (–); 5P52K0IJ7T (+) |
| CompTox Dashboard (EPA) | DTXSID90954109 |
- InChI: (–): InChI=1S/C31H32O2P2/c1-31(2)32-29(23-34(25-15-7-3-8-16-25)26-17-9-4-10-18-26)30(33-31)24-35(27-19-11-5-12-20-27)28-21-13-6-14-22-28/h3-22,29-30H,23-24H2,1-2H3/t29-,30-/m0/s1 Key: VCHDBLPQYJAQSQ-KYJUHHDHSA-N
- SMILES: (–): CC1(O[C@H]([C@@H](O1)CP(c2ccccc2)c3ccccc3)CP(c4ccccc4)c5ccccc5)C

Properties
| Chemical formula | C_{31}H_{32}O_{2}P_{2} |
| Molar mass | 498.543 g·mol^{−1} |
| Appearance | White solid |
| Melting point | 86 to 89 °C (187 to 192 °F; 359 to 362 K) |
| Solubility in water | Insoluble |
- Except where otherwise noted, data are given for materials in their standard state (at 25 °C [77 °F], 100 kPa). Infobox references

DIOP (2,3-O-isopropylidene-2,3-dihydroxy-1,4-bis(diphenylphosphino)butane) is an organophosphorus compound that is used as a chiral ligand in asymmetric catalysis. It is a white solid that is soluble in organic solvents.

DIOP is prepared from the acetonide of d,l-tartaric acid, which is reduced prior to attachment of the PPh_{2} substituents.

== Use ==
The DIOP ligand binds to metals via a conformationally flexible seven-membered C_{4}P_{2}M chelate ring.

DIOP is a historically important in the development of ligands for use in asymmetric catalysis, an atom-economical method for the preparation of chiral compounds. Described in 1971, it was the first example of a C_{2}-symmetric diphosphine. Its complexes have been applied to the reduction of prochiral olefins, ketones, and imines. Knowles et al. independently reported the related C_{2}-symmetric diphosphine DIPAMP.

Since the discovery of DIOP, many analogues of DIOP have been introduced. These DIOP derivatives include MOD-DIOP, Cy-DIOP, DIPAMP, and DBP-DIOP. Out of many derivatives, DBP-DIOP exhibits good regio- and enantioselectivity in the hydroformylation of butenes and styrene. DIOP was the first chiral ligand used in the platinum-tin-catalyzed hydroformylation. The reactivity, chemoselectivity, and enantioselectivity of DIOP are influenced by CO and H_{2} pressure and solvent polarity. The best results in asymmetric hydroformylation are achieved in solvents with medium polarity: benzene and toluene.
