= Neal H. Williams =

- Born: 1870
- Died: 1956 (aged 85–86)
- Education: University of Michigan
- Known for: Microwave spectroscopy
- Scientific career
- Fields: Physicist
- Workplaces: University of Michigan
- Doctoral advisor: Karl Eugen Guthe
- Doctoral students: Walter S. Huxford; Claud E. Cleeton

Neal Hooker Williams (1870–1956) was a physicist notable for the very first spectroscopic measurements at microwave frequencies. He carried this out with a magnetron and investigated the spectrum of gaseous ammonia together with his student Claud E. Cleeton. This formed the groundwork for the later inventions of the radar and the gas laser.

== Education ==
He completed his PhD in 1912 at the University of Michigan with a thesis entitled The Stability of Residual Magnetism.

== Books by Williams ==
- Walter S. Huxford and Neal H. Williams, Determination of the Charge of Positive Thermions from Measurements of the Shot Effect, Minneapolis, Minn., 1929.
- Claud E. Cleeton and Neal H. Williams, Electromagnetic Waves of 1.1 cm Wave-Length and the Absorption Spectrum of Ammonia, Lancaster, Pa., Lancaster press, inc., 1934.
- Harrison M. Randall, Neal H. Williams, and Walter F. Colby, General College Physics, New York, London, Harper & brothers, 1929.
- Neal H. Williams, The Stability of Residual Magnetism, New York, 1913.

== See also ==
- Trigonal pyramidal molecular geometry
- Ammonia
- Microwave spectroscopy
- Claud E. Cleeton
