= Claud E. Cleeton =

American physicist

Claud Edwin Cleeton
- Born: December 11, 1907; Schuyler County, Missouri US
- Died: April 16, 1997 (aged 89); Bellevue, Washington, US
- Education: University of Michigan
- Known for: Microwave spectroscopy
- Scientific career
- Fields: Physicist
- Workplaces: Naval Research Laboratory
- Doctoral advisor: Neal H. Williams

Claud Edwin Cleeton (December 11, 1907 – April 16, 1997) was an American physicist notable for his groundbreaking work, with Neal H. Williams, on the microwave spectroscopy of ammonia. This was the groundwork that led to the eventual development of the radar.

== Education ==
In 1935 he completed his PhD at the University of Michigan, under Neal H. Williams, with a thesis entitled: Electromagnetic-Waves of 1.1 cm Wavelength and the Absorption Spectrum of Ammonia. The 1934 paper by Cleeton and Williams has over 260 citations and was important in the development of microwave spectroscopy.

== Career ==
After obtaining his PhD, Cleeton went to work for the Navy and during World War II he was with the Naval Research Laboratory, where he improved radar systems. After the war, he conceived and developed a space surveillance system that detected Soviet satellites.

== Honors ==
For his wartime efforts, Cleeton received the President's Certificate of Merit from Harry Truman in 1946 and the Meritorious Civilian Service Award the following year. After retiring from the Naval Research Laboratory in 1969, he was awarded the Navy Distinguished Civilian Award and in 1993 the IEEE Microwave Pioneer Award. He held patents on 15 electronic inventions and authored numerous papers in technical journals.

== Retirement and death ==
When he retired, he wrote books on stock trading, and he taught himself to use the computer. Cleeton joined the First United Methodist Church of Bellevue, Washington and wrote computer programs to do the church's bookkeeping. Cleeton also developed computer programs for stock analysis. Cleeton died of heart failure April 16, 1997, at the age of 89.

Cleeton was survived by his wife of 66 years, Mary Ellen; two daughters, Sue Guildi and Sarah Kakaley.

== Books by Cleeton ==
- Claud E. Cleeton, The Art of Independent Investing, Pearson Education Limited, 1976, ISBN 0-13-047290-5
- Claud E. Cleeton, Strategies for the Option Trader, Wiley & Sons Limited, 1979, ISBN 0-471-04973-5

== See also ==
- Trigonal pyramidal molecular geometry
- Ammonia
- Microwave spectroscopy
- Neal H. Williams
