= C2-Symmetric ligands =

Ligands that lack mirror symmetry but have two-fold rotational symmetry

In homogeneous catalysis, C_{2}-symmetric ligands refer to ligands that lack mirror symmetry but have C_{2} symmetry (two-fold rotational symmetry). Such ligands are usually bidentate and are valuable in catalysis. The C_{2} symmetry of ligands limits the number of possible reaction pathways and thereby increases enantioselectivity, relative to asymmetrical analogues. C_{2}-symmetric ligands are a subset of chiral ligands. Chiral ligands, including C_{2}-symmetric ligands, combine with metals or other groups to form chiral catalysts. These catalysts engage in enantioselective chemical synthesis, in which chirality in the catalyst yields chirality in the reaction product.

== Examples ==
An early C_{2}-symmetric ligand, diphosphine catalytic ligand DIPAMP, was developed in 1968 by William S. Knowles and coworkers of Monsanto Company, who shared the 2001 Nobel Prize in Chemistry. This ligand was used in the industrial production of L-DOPA.

Synthesis of L-DOPA via hydrogenation with C_{2}-symmetric diphosphine.

Some classes of C_{2}-symmetric ligands are called privileged ligands, which are ligands that are broadly applicable to multiple catalytic processes, not only a single reaction type.

Ligands and Complexes

The C_{2}-symmetric diphosphine DIOP is historically significant.

DuPhos ligands are a class of C_{2}-symmetric ligands for asymmetric hydrogenation.

Oxaliplatin, containing the C_{2}-symmetric (R,R)-diaminocyclohexane ligand, is an important anticancer drug.

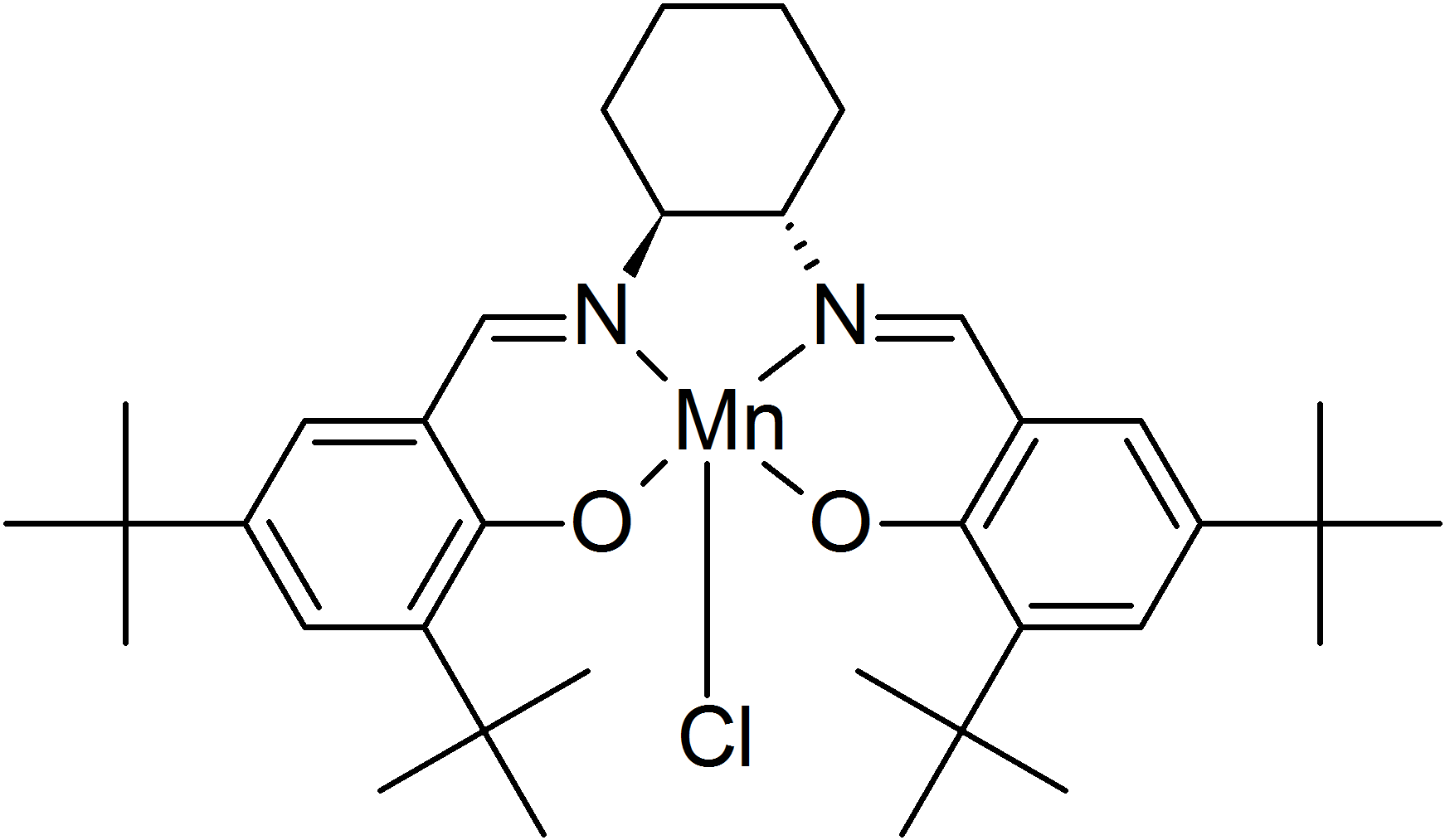
Jacobsen's epoxidation catalyst is a complex of a C_{2}-symmetric salen-type ligand.

C_{2}-symmetric diene ligand.

Both bi- and tridentate bis(oxazoline) ligands are used in organic synthesis

Both enantiomers of BINAP

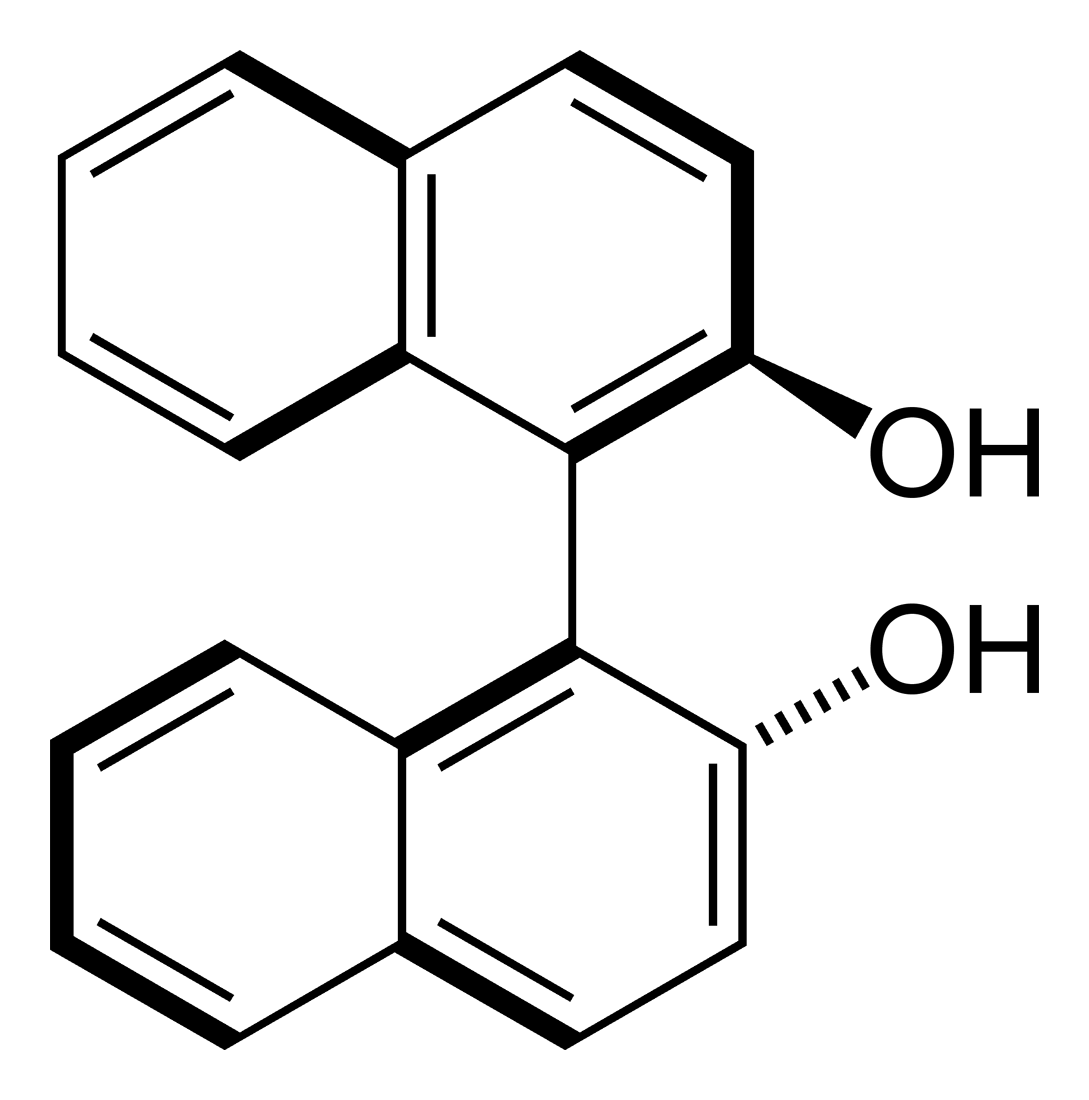
BINOL, another binaphthalene-based ligand

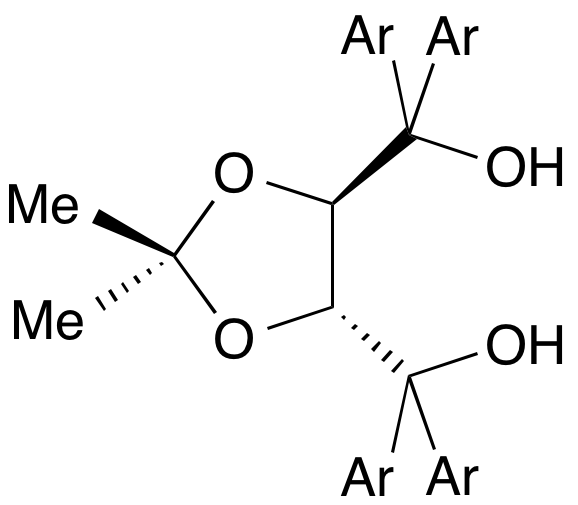
TADDOL

DIPAMP, a diphosphine of historic significance

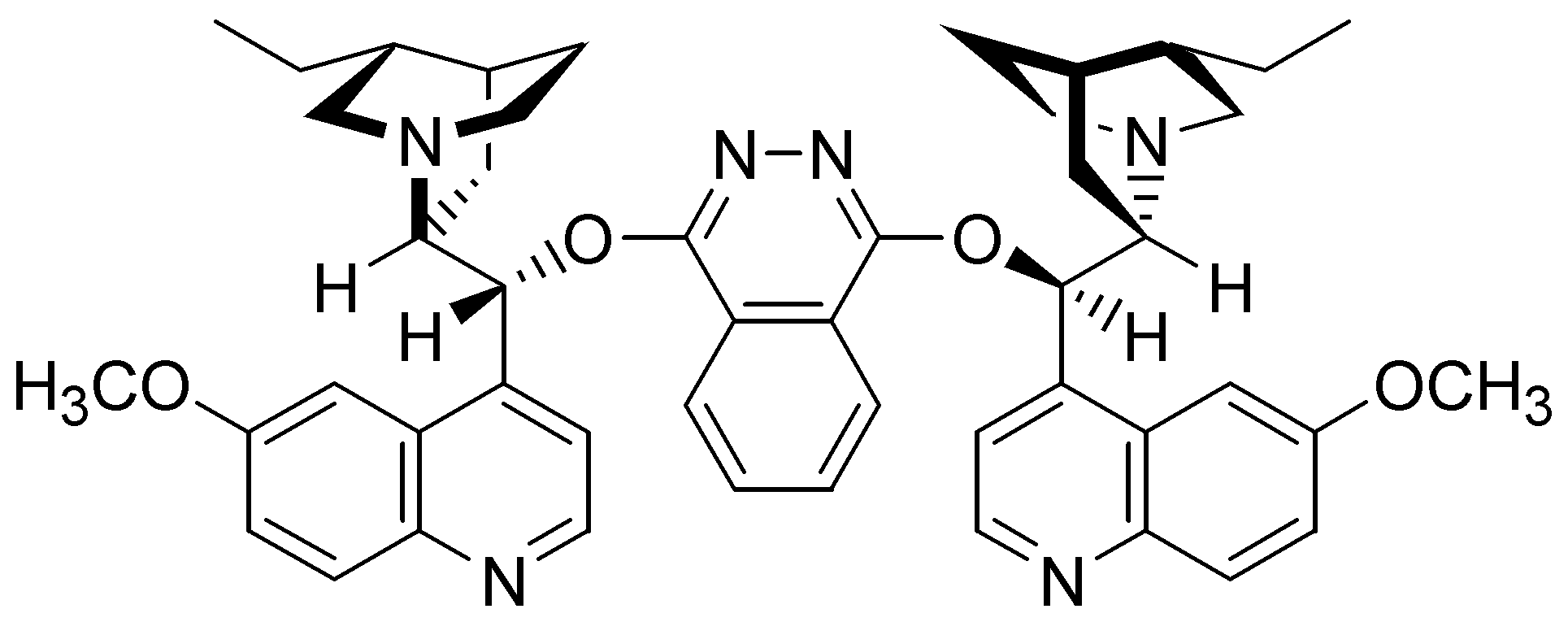
AD-mix α, dihydroquinine derivative used in Sharpless asymmetric dihydroxylation

== Mechanistic concepts ==
While the presence of any symmetry element within a ligand intended for asymmetric induction might appear counterintuitive, asymmetric induction only requires that the ligand be chiral (i.e. have no improper rotation axis). Asymmetry (i.e. absence of any symmetry elements) is not required. C_{2} symmetry improves the enantioselectivity of the complex by reducing the number of unique geometries in the transition states. Steric and kinetic factors then usually favor the formation of a single product.

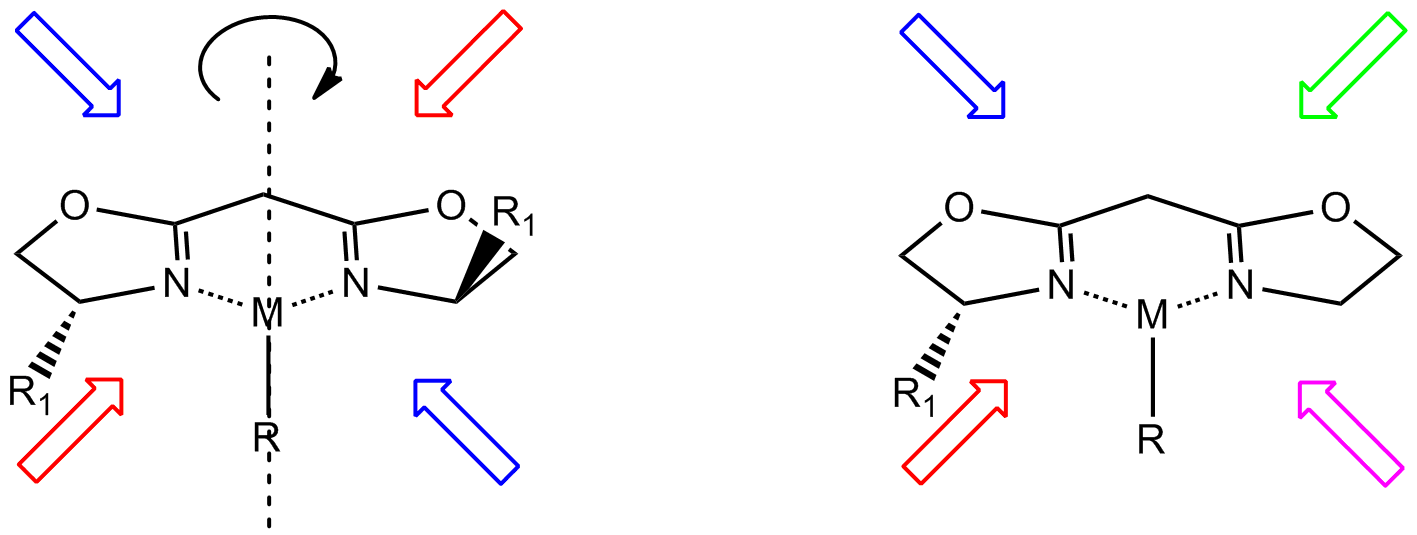
The left hand structure has a C_{2}‑rotational axis whereas the right hand structure is asymmetric. Arrows indicate the proposed trajectories for attack by substrates, identical colours lead to identical transition states (and hence products) with red arrows being disfavoured due to steric repulsion.

=== Chiral fence ===
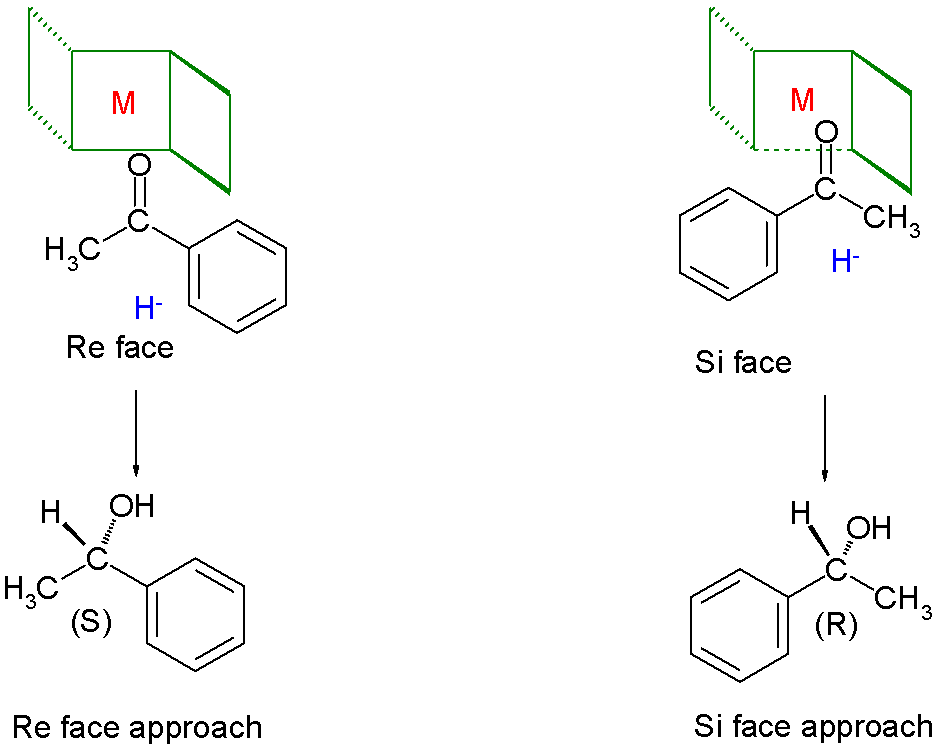
The chiral fence

Chiral ligands work by asymmetric induction somewhere along the reaction coordinate. The image to the right illustrates how a chiral ligand may induce an enantioselective reaction. The ligand (in green) has C_{2} symmetry with its nitrogen, oxygen or phosphorus atoms hugging a central metal atom (in red). In this particular ligand the right side is sticking out and its left side points away. The substrate in this reduction is acetophenone and the reagent (in blue) a hydride ion. In absence of the metal and the ligand the Re face approach of the hydride ion gives the (S)-enantiomer and the Si face approach the (R)-enantiomer in equal amounts (a racemic mixture like expected). The ligand and metal presence changes all that. The carbonyl group will coordinate with the metal and due to the steric bulk of the phenyl group it will only be able to do so with its Si face exposed to the hydride ion with in the ideal situation exclusive formation of the (R) enantiomer. The re face will simply hit the chiral fence. Note that when the ligand is replaced by its mirror image the other enantiomer will form and that a racemic mixture of ligand will once again yield a racemic product. Also note that if the steric bulk of both carbonyl substituents is very similar the strategy will fail.

== Other C_{2}-symmetric complexes ==
Many C_{2}-symmetric complexes are known. Some arise not from C_{2}-symmetric ligands, but from the orientation or disposition of high symmetry ligands within the coordination sphere of the metal. Notably, EDTA and triethylenetetraamine form complexes that are C_{2}-symmetric by virtue of the way the ligands wrap around the metal centers. Two isomers are possible for (indenyl)_{2}MX_{2}, C_{s}- and C_{2}-symmetric. The C_{2}-symmetric complexes are optically stable.

== Asymmetric ligands ==
Ligands containing atomic chirality centers such asymmetric carbon, which usually do not have C_{2}-symmetry, remain important in catalysis. Examples include cinchona alkaloids and certain phosphoramidites. P-chiral monophosphines have also been investigated.

== See also ==
- Chiral anion catalysis
