= Richard W. Jones =

Dick Jones
- Born: May 9, 1904
- Died: February 26, 1987 (aged 82); Fort Myers, Florida
- Education: University of Minnesota; Northwestern University
- Scientific career
- Fields: Biomedical engineer
- Workplaces: Northwestern University
- Academic advisors: Walter S. Huxford
- Doctoral students: Robert B. Pinter; Peter Dallos

Richard Ward Jones (1904–1987) was a biomedical engineer and authority on physiological control systems.

== Education ==
His BS was from the University of Minnesota, 1926. His MS in physics was from Northwestern University, 1941, under Walter S. Huxford for a thesis entitled: Discharge Across Very Small Gaps.

== Career ==
Dick Jones worked at Northwestern University until his retirement in 1971, where he pioneered the biomedical engineering program there.

== Honors ==
He was elected to Fellow of the IEEE in 1965, and his citation reads "For contributions in the fields of physiological control systems and biomedical engineering education."

== Selected publications ==
- Christina Enroth-Cugell and Richard W. Jones, "Responses of retinal ganglion cells to exponentially increasing light stimuli," Science, Vol. 134, No. 3493, pp. 1884–1885, 1961.
- Fred S. Grodins, John S. Gray, Karl R. Schroeder, Arthur L. Norins, and Richard W. Jones, "Respiratory responses to CO_{2} inhalation. A theoretical study of a nonlinear biological regulator," J. Appl. Physiol., Vol. 7, No. 3, pp. 283–308, 1954.
- Christina Enroth-Cugell and Richard W. Jones, "Responses of cat retinal ganglion cells to exponentially changing light intensities," J. Neurophysiol., Vol. 26, No. 6, pp. 894–907, 1963.

== Books ==
- Richard Ward Jones, Electric Control Systems, Wiley, New York, 1953.
- Richard Ward Jones, Principles of Biological Regulation; An Introduction to Feedback Systems, Academic Press, New York, 1973, ISBN 0-12-389950-8.
