= Walter S. Huxford =

Walter Huxford
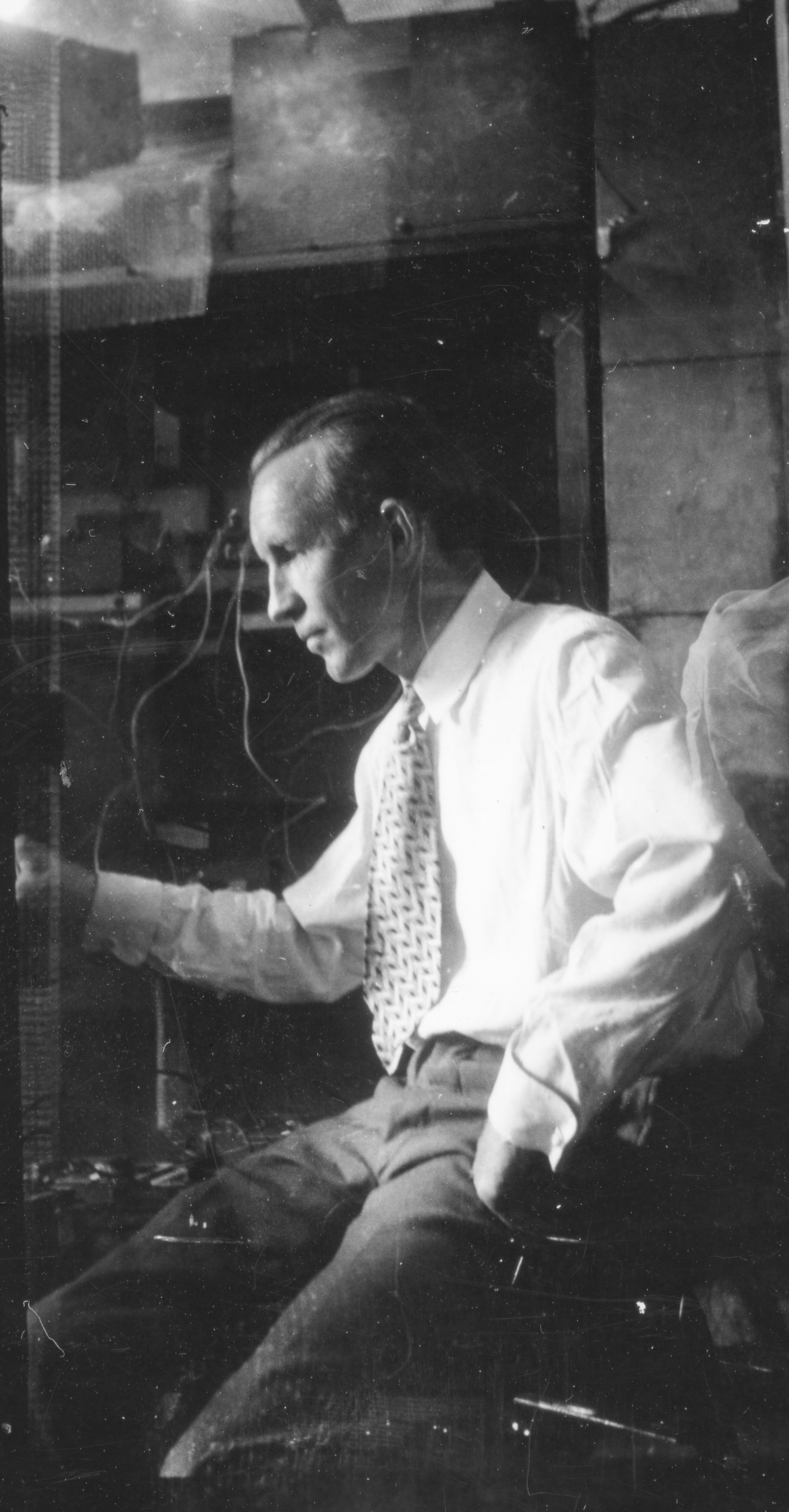
- Born: December 15, 1892; Neligh, Nebraska, US
- Died: February 12, 1958 (aged 65)
- Education: Doane College; University of Nebraska; University of Michigan
- Known for: Sunburnometer
- Spouse: Mary Bertha Whalen Huxford
- Scientific career
- Fields: Physicist
- Workplaces: Northwestern University; U. S. Army Signal Corps; Doane College
- Doctoral advisor: Neal H. Williams
- Notable students: Richard W. Jones

Walter Scott Huxford was an American professor of physics at Northwestern University and was a co-inventor of the sunburnometer.

== Education ==
His education included a bachelor's degree at Doane College, a master's degree at the University of Nebraska, and a PhD degree at the University of Michigan in 1928, with a thesis entitled: Determination of the Charge of Positive Thermions form Measurements of the Shot Effect.

== Career ==
He spent two years as an officer in the US Army Signal Corps during and after the first world war, teaching in Nebraska high schools and at Doane College, where he was head of the Physics Department, and three years as an industrial physicist. He joined the faculty of Northwestern University in 1931, where he continued to serve as a teacher and research scientist until his death. His primary research interests were physical electronics and the dynamics of electrical discharges in gases, in which fields he and his research students published numerous papers. During and following the second world war he served as director of research and development programs at Northwestern on the use of optical radiation for communication, sponsored by the US Navy Bureau of Ships and the US Army Signal Corps.

== Honors ==
His contributions to the national defense were recognized by award of the Army and Navy Certificate of Merit in 1947. Huxford was a fellow of the American Physical Society and a member of the American Association of Physics Teachers and a member of the Optical Society of America.

== Personal life ==
He died at age 65 in 1958. He was survived by his wife, Mary Bertha Huxford, née Whalen, one son, and three daughters.
