= Energy level splitting =

Splitting of atomic energy levels in rubidium

In quantum physics, energy level splitting or a split in an energy level of a quantum system occurs when a perturbation changes the system. The perturbation changes the corresponding Hamiltonian and the outcome is change in eigenvalues; several distinct energy levels emerge in place of the former degenerate (multi-state) level. This may occur because of external fields, quantum tunnelling between states, or other effects. The term is most commonly used in reference to the electron configuration in atoms or molecules.

The simplest case of level splitting is a quantum system with two states whose unperturbed Hamiltonian is a diagonal operator: Ĥ_{0} = E_{0} I, where I is the 2 × 2 identity matrix. Eigenstates and eigenvalues (energy levels) of a perturbed Hamiltonian

$$\hat H_\varepsilon = \hat H_0+\varepsilon\sigma_3 =\begin{pmatrix} E_0+\varepsilon & 0 \\ 0 & E_0-\varepsilon \end{pmatrix}$$

will be:

|0⟩: the E_{0} + ε level, and
|1⟩: the E_{0} − ε level,

so this degenerate E_{0} eigenvalue splits in two whenever ε ≠ 0. Though, if a perturbed Hamiltonian is not diagonal for this quantum states basis {|0⟩, |1⟩} , then Hamiltonian's eigenstates are linear combinations of these two states.

For a physical implementation such as a charged spin-½ particle in an external magnetic field, the z-axis of the coordinate system is required to be collinear with the magnetic field to obtain a Hamiltonian in the form above (the σ_{3} Pauli matrix corresponds to z-axis). These basis states, referred to as spin-up and spin-down, are hence eigenvectors of the perturbed Hamiltonian, so this level splitting is both easy to demonstrate mathematically and intuitively evident.

But in cases where the choice of state basis is not determined by a coordinate system, and the perturbed Hamiltonian is not diagonal, a level splitting may appear counter-intuitive, as in examples from chemistry below.

== Examples ==
In atomic physics:

- The Zeeman effect – the splitting of electronic levels in an atom because of an external magnetic field.
- The Stark effect – splitting because of an external electric field.

In physical chemistry:

- The Jahn–Teller effect – splitting of electronic levels in a molecule because breaking the symmetry lowers the energy when the degenerate orbitals are partially filled.
- Resonance (chemistry) leads to creation of delocalized electron states. (Feynman 1965, chapter 10, § 4)
- Nitrogen inversion leads to level splitting in ammonia (Feynman 1965, chapter 8, § 6), which is used in an ammonia maser. (Feynman 1965, chapter 9)
