= Ryōji Noyori =

Japanese chemist (born 1938)

Ryōji Noyori ForMemRS
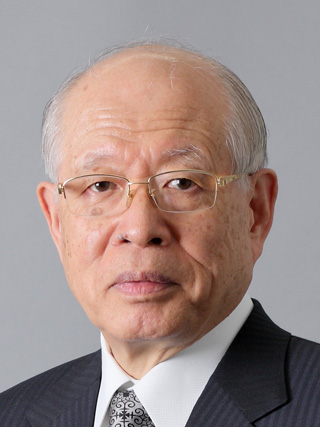
- Noyori in 2002
- Born: 3 September 1938 (age 87); Kobe, Japan
- Education: Kyoto University
- Awards: Asahi Prize (1992); Tetrahedron Prize (1993); Arthur C. Cope Award (1997); Nobel Prize for Chemistry (2001); Wolf Prize in Chemistry (2001); Lomonosov Gold Medal (2009)
- Scientific career
- Fields: Chemistry; Green chemistry; Asymmetric catalysis
- Workplaces: Harvard University; RIKEN; Nagoya University
- Doctoral advisor: Hitoshi Nozaki
- Other academic advisors: Elias J. Corey
- Website: www.nobelprize.org/nobel_prizes/chemistry/laureates/2001/noyori-facts.html

Ryōji Noyori (野依 良治, Noyori Ryōji; born 3 September 1938) is a Japanese chemist. He won the Nobel Prize in Chemistry in 2001. Noyori shared a half of the prize with William S. Knowles for the study of chirally catalyzed hydrogenations; the second half of the prize went to K. Barry Sharpless for his study in chirally catalyzed oxidation reactions (Sharpless epoxidation).

== Education and career ==
Ryōji Noyori was born in Kobe, Japan. Early in his school days Ryoji was interested in physics. His interest was kindled by the famous physicist Hideki Yukawa (1949 Nobel Prize in Physics winner), a close friend of his father. Later, he became fascinated with chemistry, after hearing a presentation on nylon at an industrial exposition. He saw the power of chemistry as being the ability to "produce high value from almost nothing". He was a student at the School of Engineering (Department of Industrial Chemistry) of the Kyoto University, where he graduated in 1961. He subsequently obtained a Master's degree in Industrial Chemistry from the Graduate School of Engineering of the Kyoto University. Between 1963 and 1967, he was a research associate at the School of Engineering of the Kyoto University, and an instructor in the research group of Hitoshi Nozaki. Noyori obtained a Doctor of Engineering degree (DEng) from the Kyoto University in 1967. He became an associate professor at the same university in 1968. After postdoctoral work with Elias J. Corey at Harvard he returned to Nagoya, becoming a full professor in 1972. He is still based at Nagoya, and served as president of RIKEN, a multi-site national research initiative with an annual budget of $800 million, from 2003 to 2015.

== Research ==
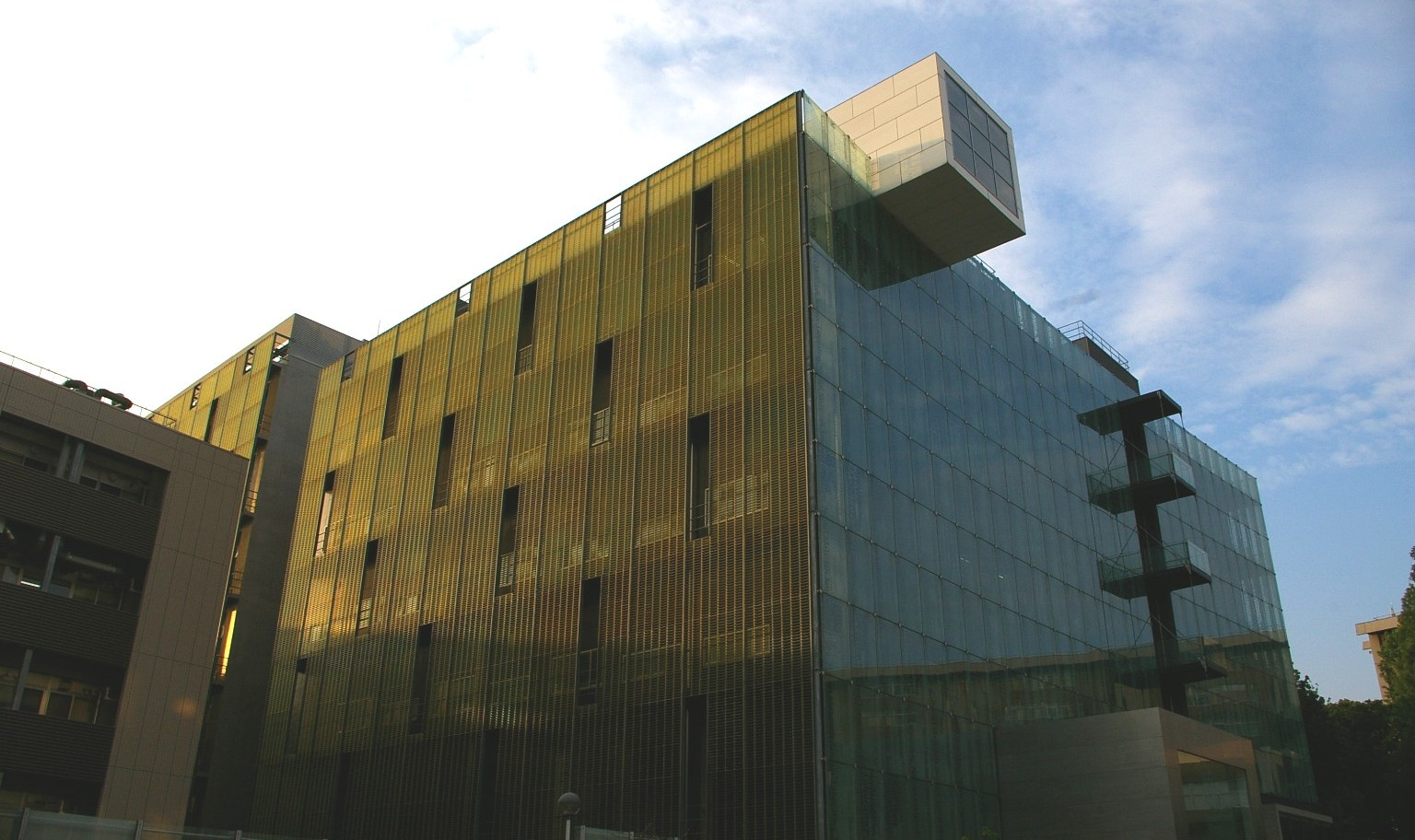
Noyori Materials Science Laboratory in Nagoya University

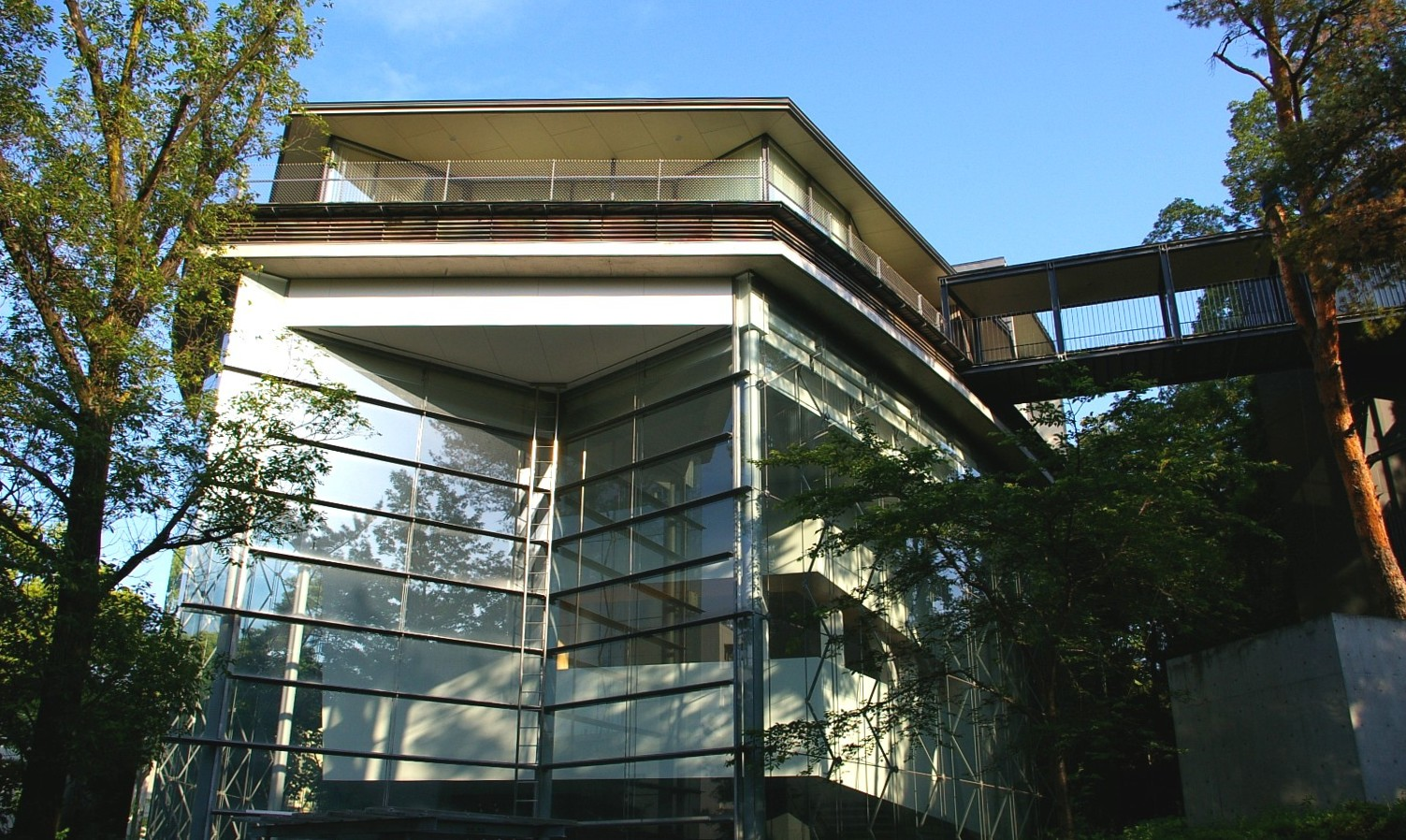
Noyori Conference Hall in Nagoya University

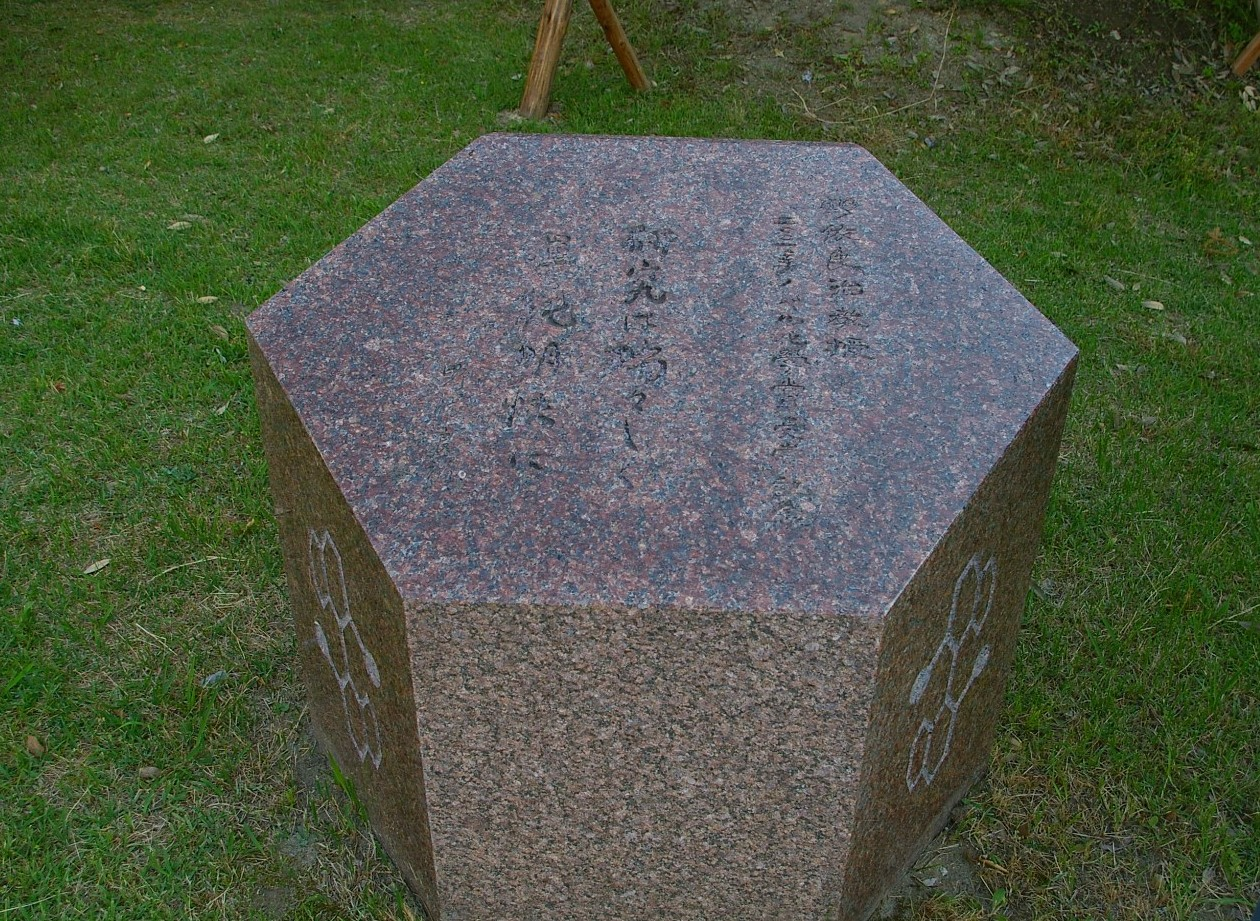
Study with a fresh and straightforward mind! (in Nagoya University)

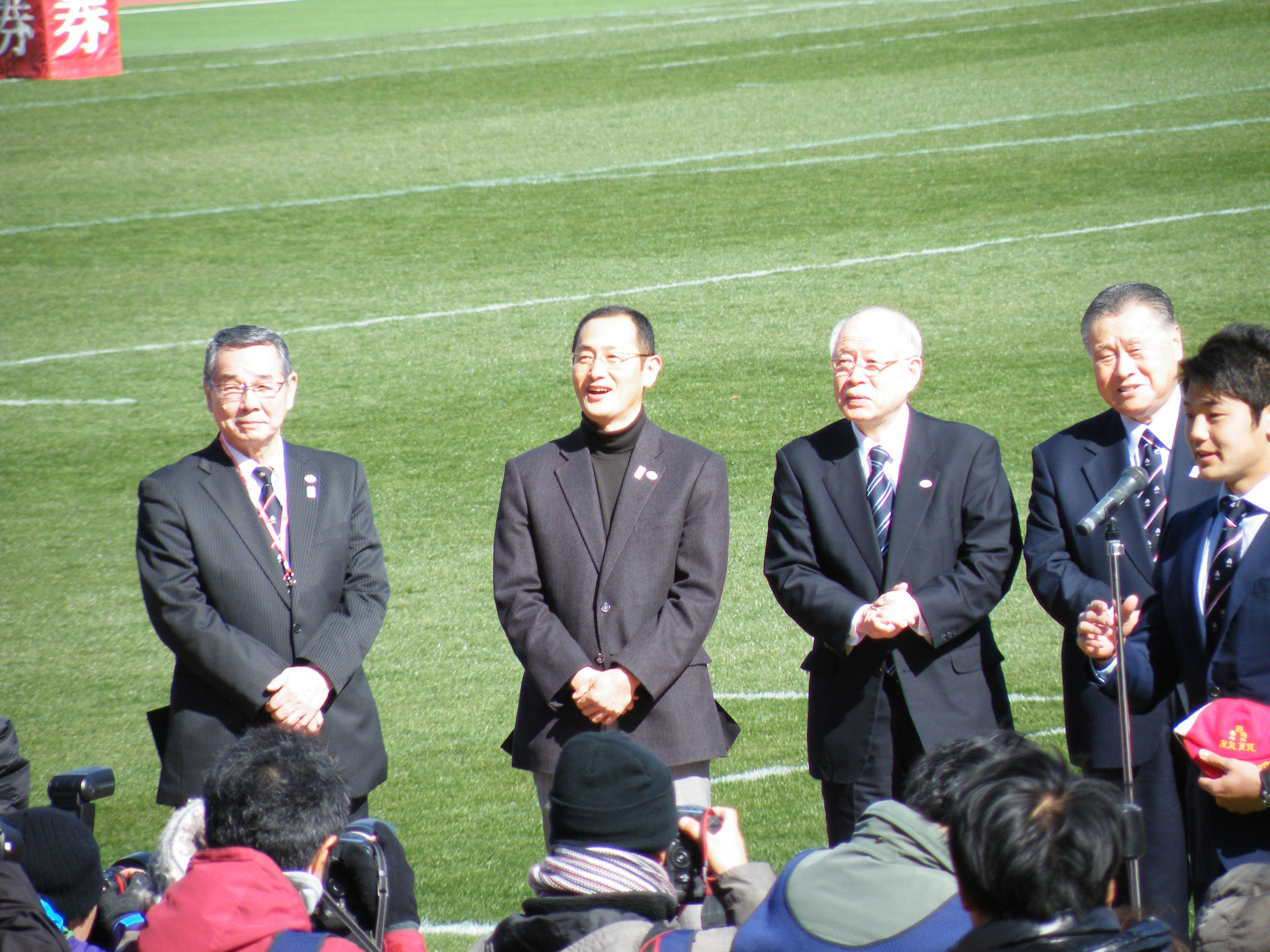
Noyori and Shinya Yamanaka participating in the ceremony of the 50th All Japan Rugby Football Championship

Noyori believes strongly in the power of catalysis and of green chemistry; in a 2005 article he argued for the pursuit of "practical elegance in synthesis". In this article he stated that "our ability to devise straightforward and practical chemical syntheses is indispensable to the survival of our species." Elsewhere he has said that "Research is for nations and mankind, not for researchers themselves." He encourages scientists to be politically active: "Researchers must spur public opinions and government policies toward constructing the sustainable society in the 21st century."

Noyori is currently a chairman of the Education Rebuilding Council, which was set up by Japan's PM Shinzō Abe after he came to power in 2006.

Noyori is most famous for asymmetric hydrogenation using as catalysts complexes of rhodium and ruthenium, particularly those based on the BINAP ligand. Asymmetric hydrogenation of an alkene in the presence of ((S)-BINAP)Ru(OAc)_{2} is used for the commercial production of enantiomerically pure (97% ee) naproxen, a nonsteriodal anti-inflammatory drug. The antibacterial agent levofloxacin is manufactured by asymmetric hydrogenation of ketones in the presence of a Ru(II) BINAP halide complex.

He has also worked on other asymmetric processes. Each year 3000 tonnes (after new expansion) of menthol are produced (in 94% ee) by Takasago International Corporation, using Noyori's method for isomerisation of allylic amines.

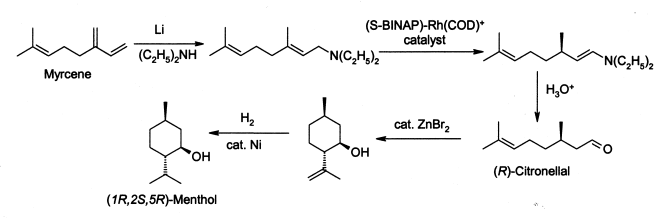

More recently with Philip G. Jessop, Noyori has developed an industrial process for the manufacture of N,N-dimethylformamide from hydrogen, dimethylamine and supercritical carbon dioxide in the presence of RuCl_{2}(P(CH_{3})_{3})_{4} as catalyst.

== Recognition ==
The Ryoji Noyori Prize is named in his honour. In 2000 Noyori became Honorary Doctor at the University of Rennes 1, where he taught in 1995, and in 2005, he became Honorary Doctor at Technical University of Munich and RWTH Aachen University, Germany. Noyori was elected a Foreign Member of the Royal Society (ForMemRS) in 2005. and an Honorary Doctorate degree from the Institute of Chemical Technology, Mumbai (formerly known as UDCT) on the 23rd day of February 2018.

He has also been awarded:

- 1978 – Matsunaga prize
- 1982 – Chuniichi Culture Award
- 1985 – The Chemical Society of Japan Award
- 1991 – John G. Kirkwood Award, American Chemical Society and Yale University
- 1992 – Asahi Prize
- 1993 – Tetrahedron Prize
- 1995 – Japan Academy Prize (academics)
- 1997 – Arthur C. Cope Award
- 1997 – Chirality Medal
- 1999 – King Faisal International Prize
- 2001 – Wolf Prize in Chemistry
- 2001 – Nobel Prize for Chemistry
- 2009 – Lomonosov Gold Medal

== See also ==
- List of Japanese Nobel laureates
- List of Nobel laureates affiliated with Kyoto University
