= John Oren Reed =

American physicist

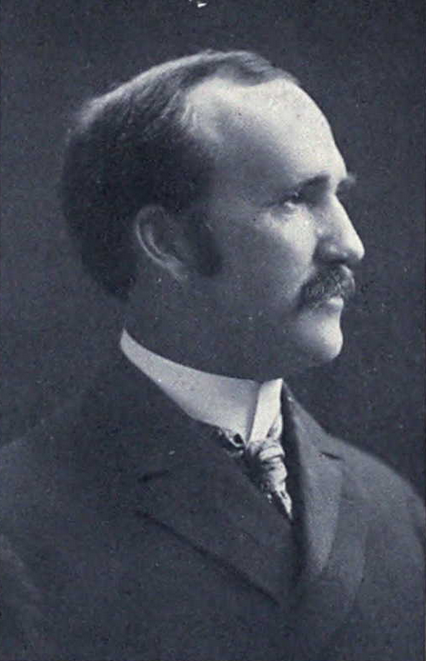
John Oren Reed, 1912

John Oren Reed (1856 – January 22, 1916) was an American physicist and university dean.

== Biography ==
Born at New Castle, Indiana, in 1885 he graduated from the University of Michigan, where, after studying at Harvard (1891–1892), he was instructor (1892–1894), assistant professor (1894–1899), junior professor (1899–1905), and professor of physics.

He earned a Ph. D. at Friedrich Schiller University of Jena in Germany in 1897.

He was also dean of the summer session from 1899 to 1908 and of the Department of Literature, Science, and the Arts after 1907, and director of the Physical Laboratory after 1909.

He died in Cleveland, Ohio on January 22, 1916.

== Publications ==
His publications include:

- A Manual of Physical Measurements (1902; third edition, 1912), with K. E. Guthe
- College Physics (1902)
- College Physics (1911)
- High School Physics; with W. D. Henderson
