= Robert B. Pinter =

- Born: August 13, 1937; Milwaukee, Wisconsin, US
- Died: December 11, 2001 (aged 64)
- Education: Marquette University; Northwestern University
- Scientific career
- Fields: Biomedical engineer
- Workplaces: University of Washington
- Doctoral advisor: Richard W. Jones

Robert Bartholomew Pinter was an American biomedical engineer and authority on signal processing in the insect visual system.

== Education ==
He received a BS in electrical engineering from Marquette University in 1957 and an MS from Northwestern University in 1960. He received his PhD in electrical engineering and biomedical engineering from Northwestern University in 1964, with a thesis entitled A Study of the Dynamic Properties of the Generator Potential of the Limulus Photoreceptor. His MS and PhD were both under Richard W. Jones.

== Career ==
Pinter has joined the University of Washington in 1964 and held joint appointments with the Departments of Electrical Engineering and Zoology. He also held appointments as visiting professor of psychology at Dalhousie University, Halifax, Nova Scotia, Canada and visiting fellow of the center for visual sciences, Australian National University, Canberra, Australia.

His research interests were mathematical and electronic models of the visual and nervous system and linear and nonlinear control theory.

== Books by Pinter ==
- Bahram Nabet and Robert B. Pinter, Sensory Neural Networks: Lateral Inhibition, Taylor & Francis Group, 1991, ISBN 0-8493-4278-3
- Robert B. Pinter and Bahram Nabet, Nonlinear Vision, Taylor & Francis Group, 1992, ISBN 0-8493-4292-9

== See also ==
- Insect vision
