= Karl Eugen Guthe =

American academic and physicist

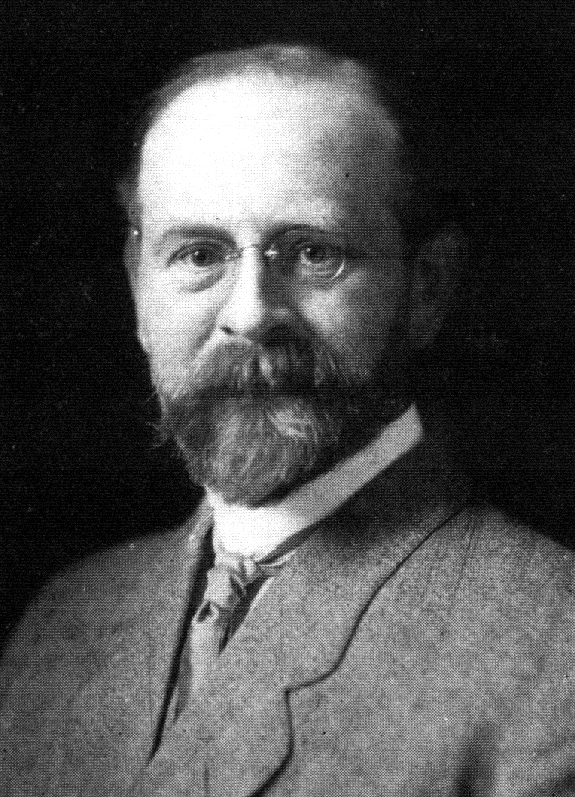
- Born: March 5, 1866; Hannover, Germany
- Died: September 15, 1915 (aged 49); Ashland, Oregon, US
- Citizenship: German, later American
- Education: University of Strasbourg; Humboldt University of Berlin; University of Marburg
- Known for: Physics textbooks
- Scientific career
- Fields: Physicist
- Workplaces: University of Michigan; Iowa State College
- Doctoral advisor: Hermann Paasche
- Doctoral students: Neal H. Williams

Karl Eugen Guthe (5 March 1866 – 10 September 1915) was a German-born American academic and physicist, notable for being the first Dean of the Graduate Department at the University of Michigan.

== Education ==
Guthe was born in Hanover, Germany, and educated at the Hanover Technical School and at the universities of Strassburg, Berlin, and Marburg. He received his PhD from the University of Marburg in 1892 for a thesis entitled: Über das mechanische Telephon (On the Mechanical Telephone). Guthe was the nephew of Hermann Guthe (1825 - 1874), a noted German geographer and professor in Hanover and Munich.

== Career and personal life ==
Guthe immigrated to the United States in the summer of 1892 to marry Clara Belle Ware (1867-1947), from Grand Rapids, Michigan. The couple met during Ware's visit to Germany in 1890–91. In 1893 Guthe obtained a position as instructor in physics at the University of Michigan, and in 1900 was promoted to assistant professor. In 1903, he moved his young family to Chevy Chase, Maryland, upon taking a position as assistant physicist at the then newly established National Bureau of Standards in Washington, D.C. (now the National Institute of Standards and Technology). In 1905 Guthe accepted an invitation to become professor of physics and chairman of the Physics Department at the University of Iowa. He was a member of the Jury of Awards at the St. Louis Exposition in 1904 and was vice president of the American Association for the Advancement of Science in 1908. In 1909 the University of Michigan solicited Guthe to return as a full professor in the Physics Department, and he moved back to Ann Arbor with his young family. In 1912 Guthe was named dean of the newly formed Graduate School at the University of Michigan.

In 1915, the University of Michigan's Board of Regents sent Dean Guthe as university delegate to annual meetings of the Association of American Universities, and the Association of State Universities, held at the University of California, Berkeley. After participating in both meetings in late August, Dean and Mrs. Guthe took a train north up the Pacific coast to visit Mrs. Guthe's older brother in Ashland, Oregon, before returning for the 1915 academic year at UM. In Ashland, Guthe became afflicted with an abdominal disorder and died during a second surgery on September 10.

Guthe's youngest son, Dr. Otto E. Guthe (1904-1984), became an assistant director of the Central Intelligence Agency. Guthe's oldest son, Dr. Carl E. Guthe (1893-1974), was the first chair of the University of Michigan's Department of Anthropology, and one of the latter's sons, Dr. Karl F. Guthe (1918-1994), was a professor of zoology at the University of Michigan. Guthe's middle child, Ida Belle Guthe, married German city planner and author Werner Hegemann.

== Books by Guthe ==
Dr. Guthe is the author of a Manual of Physical Measurements (1902; third edition, 1912), with J. O. Reed; Laboratory Exercises with Primary and Storage Cells (1903); Textbook of Physics (1908; second edition, 1909); College Physics (1911), with J. O. Reed; Definitions in Physics (1913); as well as a multitude of articles on physics and electricity published in various scientific journals.
