= DIPAMP =

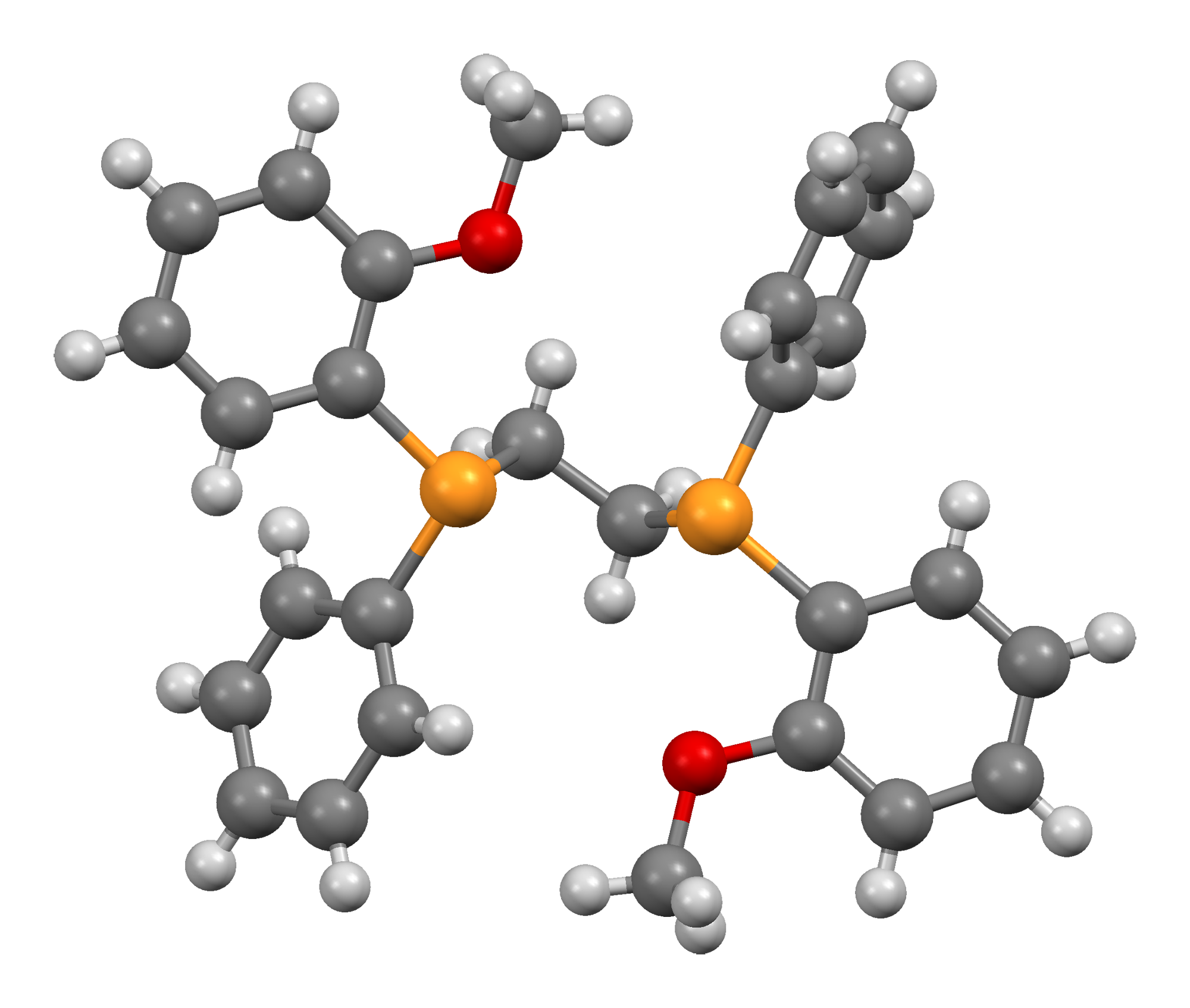

Names
- Preferred IUPAC name (Ethane-1,2-diyl)bis[(2-methoxyphenyl)(phenyl)phosphane]

Identifiers
CAS Number	63589-61-7; (R,R): 55739-58-7; (S,S): 97858-62-3
3D model (JSmol)	(R,R): Interactive image; (S,S): Interactive image; (R,S): Interactive image
ChemSpider	2016305; (R,R): 9060243; (S,S): 9594634; (R,S): 9910039
ECHA InfoCard	100.203.286
PubChem CID	2734557; (R,R): 10884975; (S,S): 11419748; (R,S): 11735331
UNII	(R,R): BLJ831OWLW; (S,S): HS6F5EW3U6
CompTox Dashboard (EPA)	DTXSID101027541
- InChI: InChI=1S/C28H28O2P2/c1-29-25-17-9-11-19-27(25)31(23-13-5-3-6-14-23)21-22-32(24-15-7-4-8-16-24)28-20-12-10-18-26(28)30-2/h3-20H,21-22H2,1-2H3 Key: QKZWXPLBVCKXNQ-UHFFFAOYSA-N; (R,R): InChI=1S/C28H28O2P2/c1-29-25-17-9-11-19-27(25)31(23-13-5-3-6-14-23)21-22-32(24-15-7-4-8-16-24)28-20-12-10-18-26(28)30-2/h3-20H,21-22H2,1-2H3/t31-,32-/m1/s1 Key: QKZWXPLBVCKXNQ-ROJLCIKYSA-N; (S,S): InChI=1S/C28H28O2P2/c1-29-25-17-9-11-19-27(25)31(23-13-5-3-6-14-23)21-22-32(24-15-7-4-8-16-24)28-20-12-10-18-26(28)30-2/h3-20H,21-22H2,1-2H3/t31-,32-/m0/s1 Key: QKZWXPLBVCKXNQ-ACHIHNKUSA-N; (R,S): InChI=1S/C28H28O2P2/c1-29-25-17-9-11-19-27(25)31(23-13-5-3-6-14-23)21-22-32(24-15-7-4-8-16-24)28-20-12-10-18-26(28)30-2/h3-20H,21-22H2,1-2H3/t31-,32+ Key: QKZWXPLBVCKXNQ-MEKGRNQZSA-N
- SMILES: COc1ccccc1P(CCP(c2ccccc2)c3ccccc3OC)c4ccccc4; (R,R): COc1ccccc1[P@](CC[P@](c2ccccc2)c3ccccc3OC)c4ccccc4; (S,S): COc1ccccc1[P@@](CC[P@@](c2ccccc2)c3ccccc3OC)c4ccccc4; (R,S): O(c1ccccc1[P@@](c2ccccc2)CC[P@@](c3ccccc3)c4ccccc4OC)C

Properties
Chemical formula	C_{28}H_{28}O_{2}P_{2}
Molar mass	458.478 g·mol^{−1}
- Except where otherwise noted, data are given for materials in their standard state (at 25 °C [77 °F], 100 kPa). verify (what is ?) Infobox references

DIPAMP is an organophosphorus compound that is used as a ligand in homogeneous catalysis. It is a white solid that dissolves in organic solvents. Work on this compound by W. S. Knowles was recognized with the Nobel Prize in Chemistry. DIPAMP was the basis for one of the first industrial scale asymmetric hydrogenation, the synthesis of the drug L-DOPA.

Synthesis of L-DOPA via hydrogenation with the C_{2}-symmetric diphosphine DIPAMP.

DIPAMP is a C_{2}-symmetric diphosphine. Each phosphorus centre, which is pyramidal, bears three different substituents - anisyl, phenyl, and the ethylene group. The ligand therefore exists as the enantiomeric (R,R) and (S,S) pair, as well as the achiral meso isomer.

DIPAMP was originally prepared by an oxidative coupling, starting from anisyl(phenyl)(methyl)phosphine.

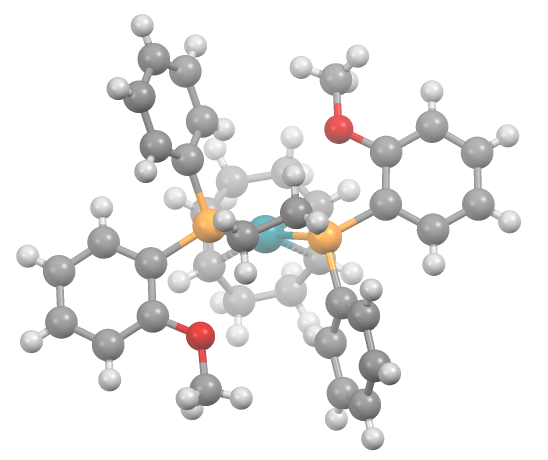
Structure of [Rh(DIPAMP)(cod)]^{+} by X-ray crystallography.
