= William Standish Knowles =

American chemist (1917–2012)

- Born: June 1, 1917; Taunton, Massachusetts, U.S.
- Died: June 13, 2012 (aged 95); Chesterfield, Missouri, U.S.
- Education: Harvard University (AB); Columbia University (PhD)
- Known for: Chiral phosphine ligands that proved effective in the enantioselective synthesis of L-DOPA
- Awards: Nobel Prize in Chemistry (2001)
- Scientific career
- Fields: Chemistry
- Workplaces: Thomas and Hochwalt Laboratories; Monsanto Company
- Thesis: A preliminary investigation of the constituents of Astragalus wootoni. Β-substituted-Δα, Β-butenolides of the naphthalene, indene and norcholane series (1942)
- Doctoral advisor: Robert Elderfield

William Standish Knowles (June 1, 1917 – June 13, 2012) was an American chemist. He was born in Taunton, Massachusetts. Knowles was one of the recipients of the 2001 Nobel Prize in Chemistry. He split half the prize with Ryōji Noyori for their work in asymmetric synthesis, specifically for his work in hydrogenation reactions. The other half was awarded to K. Barry Sharpless for his work in oxidation reactions.

== Education ==
Knowles attended Berkshire School in Sheffield, Massachusetts. He led his class academically and upon graduation was admitted to Harvard University. Feeling that he was too young to go to college, Knowles spent a year at Phillips Academy in Andover, Massachusetts. At the end of the year, he captured his first award in chemistry, the school's $50 Boylston Prize.

After his year in preparatory school, Knowles attended Harvard, where he majored in chemistry, focusing on organic chemistry. He received his undergraduate degree in 1939, and attended Columbia University for graduate school.

== Awards and honors ==
- 1983 Chemical Pioneer Award from the American Institute of Chemists
- 2001 Nobel Prize in Chemistry
- 2008 Peter H. Raven Lifetime Achievement Award, from the Academy of Science, St. Louis.

=== Nobel Prize ===
He shared half of the Nobel Prize in Chemistry in 2001 with Ryōji Noyori for "their work on chirally catalysed hydrogenation reactions". The other half of the prize was awarded to K. Barry Sharpless for the development of a range of catalytic asymmetric oxidations. Knowles developed one of the first asymmetric hydrogenation catalysts by replacing the achiral triphenylphosphine ligands in Wilkinson's catalyst with chiral phosphine ligands. This experimental catalyst was effective for enantioselective synthesis, achieving a modest 15% enantiomeric excess.

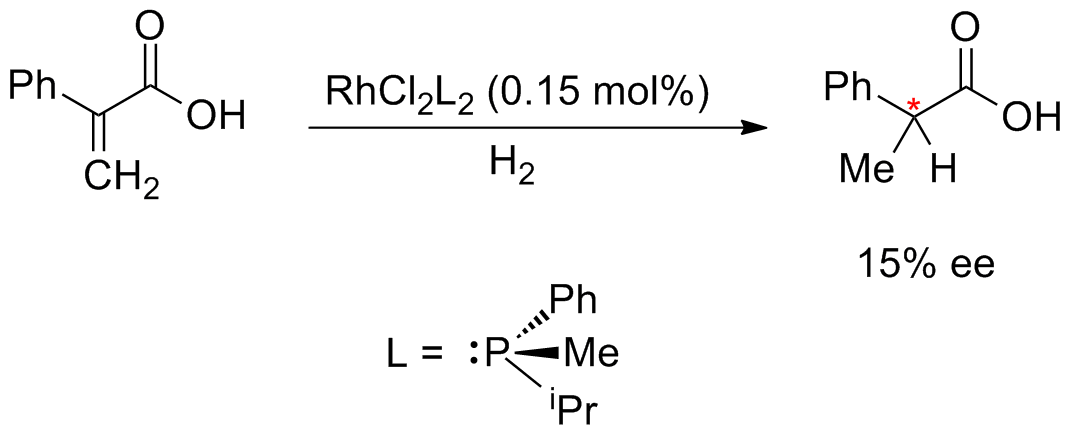

Knowles was also the first to apply enantioselective metal catalysis to industrial-scale synthesis; while working for the Monsanto Company he developed an enantioselective hydrogenation step for the production of L-DOPA, utilising the DIPAMP ligand.

Synthesis of L-DOPA via hydrogenation with C_{2}-symmetric diphosphine.

== Personal life ==
Following his retirement in 1986, Knowles resided in Chesterfield, Missouri, a suburb of St. Louis. In retirement he restored native prairie grasses on a 100-acre farm that his wife had inherited. He was married to his wife, Nancy, for 66 years and had four children, Elizabeth, Peter, Sarah and Lesley. He also had four grandchildren. Knowles died in Chesterfield on June 13, 2012, at age 95. He and his wife had previously stated that their farm would be donated to be converted into a city park after their deaths.
