= Microwave spectroscopy =

Study of matter through the use of microwaves

Microwave spectroscopy is the spectroscopy method that employs microwaves, i.e. electromagnetic radiation at GHz frequencies, for the study of matter. This spectroscopic method measures the rotation of polyatomic molecules. Microwaves lay at the low end of the magnetic spectrum, higher than radio waves but lower than radar and IR.

== In molecular physics ==
In the field of molecular physics, microwave spectroscopy is commonly used to probe the rotation of molecules via wavelengths ranging from 3×10^{8} to 3×10^{6} nanometers (nm). These are long waves with a low frequency which range from 0.033–3.3 cm^{−1}. The energy required typically ranged from 6.6×10^{−25} to 6.6×10^{−23} J/molecule.

Microwave spectroscopy depends on the principal moments of inertia as it examines the rotational moments of a polyatomic molecule. The moments of inertia are based on the rigid-rotor model and are defined by three axes: I_{xx}, I_{yy}, and I_{zz}. These can also be seen as I_{A}, I_{B}, and I_{c}. These moments of inertia will always follow the rule of A ≤ B ≤ C. Due to there being three distinct elements of the moments of inertia, symmetry can be used to characterization. If A = B = C, the rigid body is referred to as a spherical top. If two of them are equal, they are symmetrical tops. If none of them are equal, then they are referred to as an asymmetric top.

== In condensed matter physics ==
In the field of condensed matter physics, microwave spectroscopy is used to detect dynamic phenomena of either charges or spins at GHz frequencies (corresponding to nanosecond time scales) and energy scales in the μeV regime. Matching to these energy scales, microwave spectroscopy on solids is often performed as a function of temperature (down to cryogenic regimes of a few K or even lower) and/or magnetic field (with fields up to several T). Spectroscopy traditionally considers the frequency-dependent response of materials, and in the study of dielectrics microwave spectroscopy often covers a large frequency range. In contrast, for conductive samples as well as for magnetic resonance, experiments at a fixed frequency are common (using a highly sensitive microwave resonator), but frequency-dependent measurements are also possible.

=== Probing charges in condensed matter physics ===
For insulating materials (both solid and liquid), probing charge dynamics with microwaves is a part of dielectric spectroscopy. Amongst the conductive materials, superconductors are a material class that is often studied with microwave spectroscopy, giving information about penetration depth (governed by the superconducting condensate), energy gap (single-particle excitation of Cooper pairs), and quasiparticle dynamics.

Another material class that has been studied using microwave spectroscopy at low temperatures are heavy fermion metals with Drude relaxation rates at GHz frequencies.

=== Probing spins in condensed matter physics ===
Microwaves impinging on matter usually interact with charges as well as with spins (via electric and magnetic field components, respectively), with the charge response typically much stronger than the spin response. But in the case of magnetic resonance, spins can be directly probed using microwaves. For paramagnetic materials, this technique is called electron spin resonance (ESR) and for ferromagnetic materials ferromagnetic resonance (FMR). In the paramagnetic case, such an experiment probes the Zeeman splitting, with a linear relation between the static external magnetic field and the frequency of the probing microwave field. A popular combination, as implemented in commercial X-band ESR spectrometers, is approximately 0.3 T (static field) and 10 GHz (microwave frequency) for a typical material with electron g-factor close to 2.

== Applications ==
Microwave spectroscopy provides molecular information such as bond angles and bond length. These values can, in turn, be used to calculate the rotational constants.

=== High-Resolution gas phase rotational microwave spectroscopy ===
High-Resolution gas phase microwave spectroscopy can be used for conformational analysis. This method is optimal for molecules that are small, except for those symmetric top molecules. Asymmetry is where the high-resolution spectroscopy loses its resolution, resulting in very large bands. The solution to this issue lies in using low-resolution microwave spectroscopy (LRMW).

=== Low-resolution gas phase rotational microwave spectroscopy ===
Low-resolution spectroscopy has bands that range from 50–200 MHz wide. These broader bands are the distinguishing feature between high-resolution and low-resolution. These allow for the diagnosis of larger molecules and asymmetric tops.

Asymmetry in rotational tops can be attributed to the "spreading effect" which will give broader bands and decrease the accuracy of frequency calculations. The low-resolution spectroscopy accounts for the "spreading effect" and allows for correction. While not being as precise as high-resolution spectroscopy, low-resolution spectroscopy allows for gathering conformational and isometric data from larger molecules than high-resolution allows for.
