= Metal-phosphine complex =

Chemical compounds containing phosphorus and metals

A metal-phosphine complex is a coordination complex containing one or more phosphine ligands. Almost always, the phosphine is an organophosphine of the type R_{3}P (R = alkyl, aryl). Metal phosphine complexes are useful in homogeneous catalysis. Prominent examples of metal phosphine complexes include Wilkinson's catalyst (Rh(PPh_{3})_{3}Cl), Grubbs' catalyst, and tetrakis(triphenylphosphine)palladium(0).

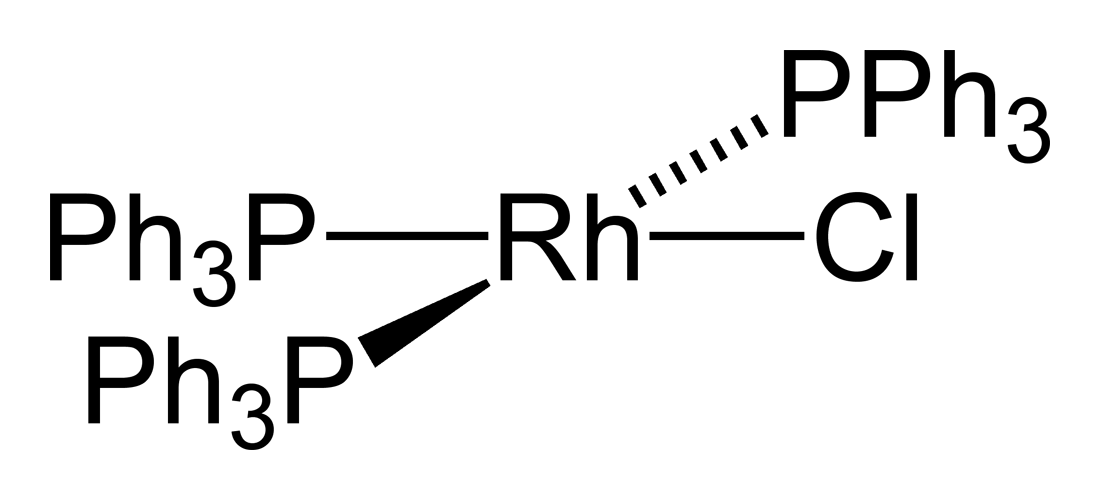
Wilkinson's catalyst, a popular catalyst for hydrogenation.

== Preparation ==
Many metal phosphine complexes are prepared by reactions of metal halides with preformed phosphines. For example, treatment of a suspension of palladium chloride in ethanol with triphenylphosphine yields monomeric bis(triphenylphosphine)palladium(II) chloride.

[PdCl_{2}]_{n} + 2n PPh_{3} → n PdCl_{2}(PPh_{3})_{2}

The first reported phosphine complexes were cis- and trans-PtCl_{2}(PEt_{3})_{2} reported by Cahours and Gal in 1870.

Often the phosphine serves both as a ligand and as a reductant. This property is illustrated by the synthesis of many platinum-metal complexes of triphenylphosphine:

RhCl_{3}(H_{2}O)_{3} + 4 PPh_{3} → RhCl(PPh_{3})_{3} + OPPh_{3} + 2 HCl + 2 H_{2}O

== M-PR_{3} bonding ==
Phosphines are L-type ligands. Unlike most metal ammine complexes, metal phosphine complexes tend to be lipophilic, displaying good solubility in organic solvents.

TEP for selected phosphines (A_{1} mode of Ni(CO)_{3}L in CH_{2}Cl_{2})
L	ν(CO) cm^{−1}
P(t-Bu)_{3}	2056.1
PMe_{3}	2064.1
PPh_{3}	2068.9
P(OEt)_{3}	2076.3
PCl_{3}	2097.0
PF_{3}	2110.8

Phosphine ligands are also π-acceptors. Their π-acidity arises from overlap of P-C σ* anti-bonding orbitals with filled metal orbitals. Aryl- and fluorophosphines are stronger π-acceptors than alkylphosphines. Trifluorophosphine has bonding properties akin to those of the carbonyl ligand. In early work, phosphine ligands were thought to utilize 3d orbitals to form M-P pi-bonding, but it is now accepted that d-orbitals on phosphorus are not involved in bonding. The energy of the σ* orbitals is lower for phosphines with electronegative substituents, and for this reason phosphorus trifluoride is a particularly good π-acceptor.

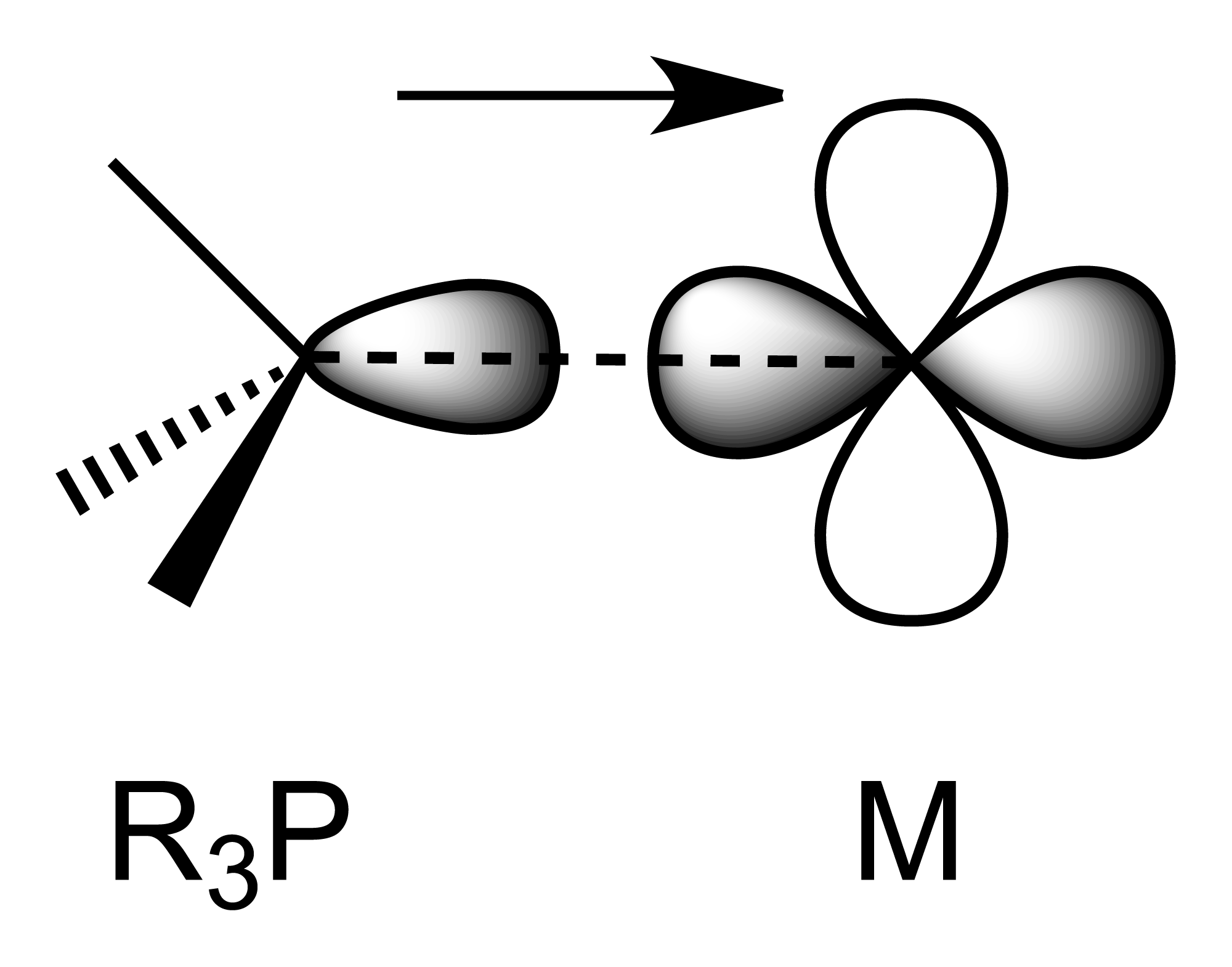
R_{3}P–M σ bonding

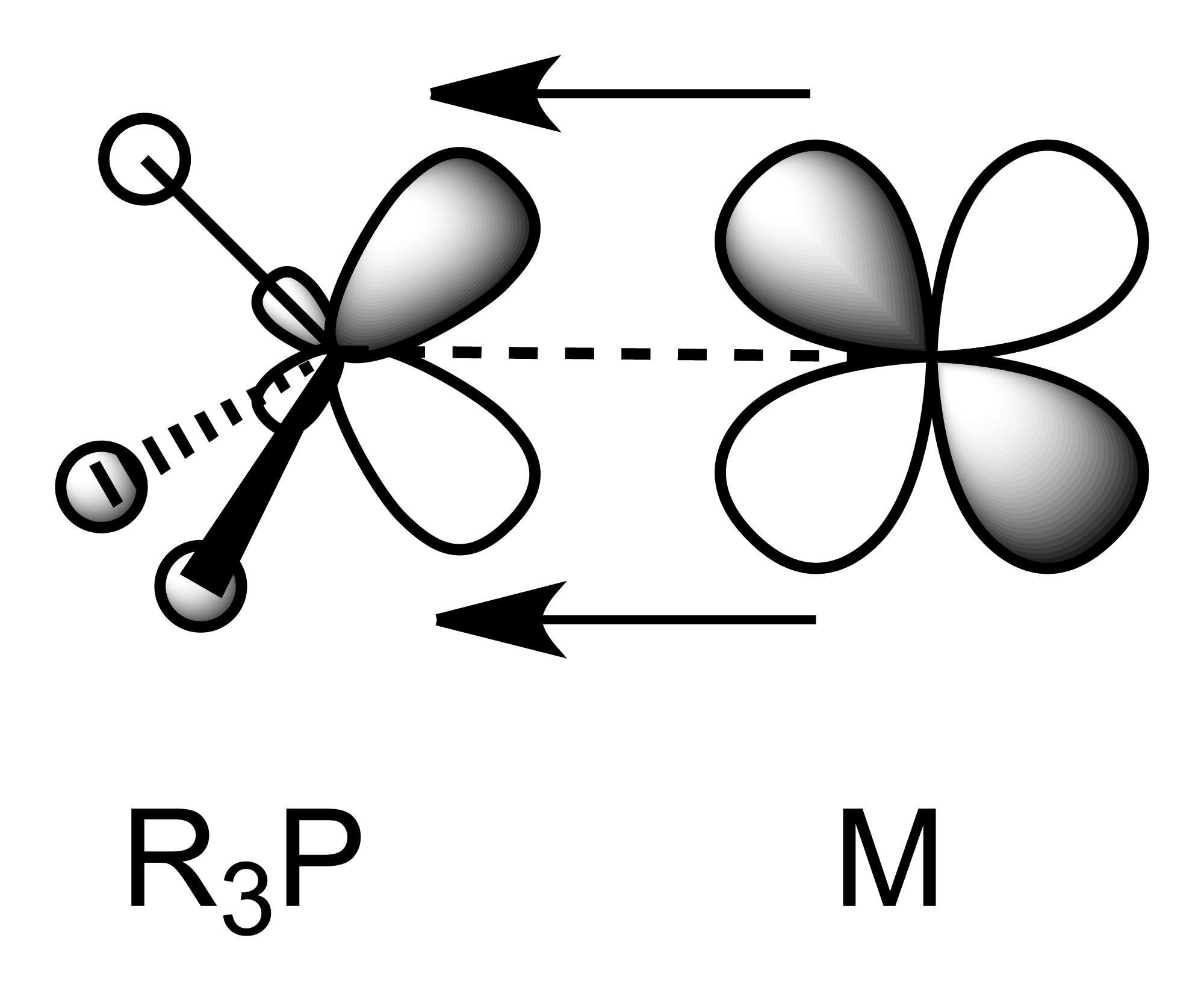
R_{3}P–M π backbonding

=== Steric properties ===
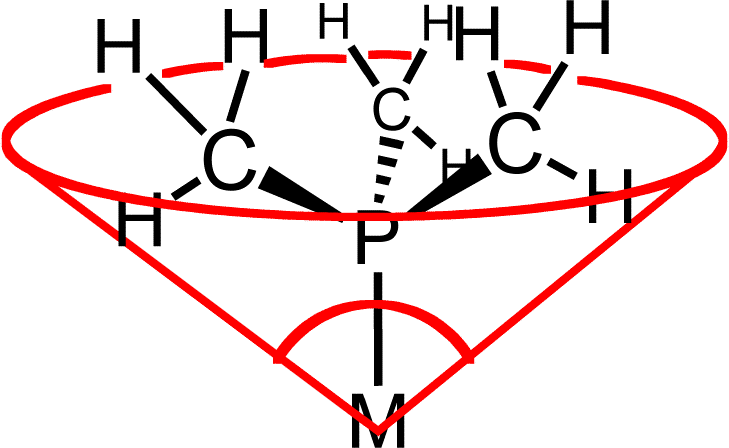
Cone angle is a common and useful parameter for evaluating the steric properties of phosphine ligands.

In contrast to tertiary phosphines, tertiary amines, especially arylamine derivatives, are reluctant to bind to metals. The difference between the coordinating power of PR_{3} and NR_{3} reflects the greater steric crowding around the nitrogen atom, which is smaller.

By changes in one or more of the three organic substituents, the steric and electronic properties of phosphine ligands can be manipulated. The steric properties of phosphine ligands can be ranked by their Tolman cone angle or percent buried volume.

=== Spectroscopy ===
An important technique for the characterization of metal-PR_{3} complexes is ^{31}P NMR spectroscopy. Substantial shifts occur upon complexation. ^{31}P-^{31}P spin-spin coupling can provide insight into the structure of complexes containing multiple phosphine ligands.

== Reactivity ==
Phosphine ligands are usually "spectator" rather than "actor" ligands. They generally do not participate in reactions, except to dissociate from the metal center. In certain high temperature hydroformylation reactions, the scission of P-C bonds is observed however. The thermal stability of phosphines ligands is enhanced when they are incorporated into pincer complexes.

== Applications to homogeneous catalysis ==
One of the first applications of phosphine ligands in catalysis was the use of triphenylphosphine in "Reppe" chemistry (1948), which included reactions of alkynes, carbon monoxide, and alcohols. In his studies, Reppe discovered that this reaction more efficiently produced acrylic esters using NiBr_{2}(PPh_{3})_{2} as a catalyst instead of NiBr_{2}. Shell developed cobalt-based catalysts modified with trialkylphosphine ligands for hydroformylation (now rhodium phosphine catalysts are more commonly used for hydroformylation). The success achieved by Reppe and his contemporaries led to many industrial applications.

=== Illustrative PPh_{3} complexes ===
- Tetrakis(triphenylphosphine)palladium(0) is widely used to catalyse C-C coupling reactions in organic synthesis, see Suzuki and Stille couplings.
- Wilkinson's catalyst, RhCl(PPh_{3})_{3}, is a square planar Rh(I) complex of historical significance used to catalyze the hydrogenation of alkenes.
- Vaska's complex, trans-IrCl(CO)(PPh_{3})_{2}, is also historically significant; it was used to establish the scope of oxidative addition reactions. This early work provided the insights that led to the flowering of the area of homogeneous catalysis.
- NiCl_{2}(PPh_{3})_{2} can be isolated as both the tetrahedral (spin triplet) and square planar (singlet) forms. In contrast, PdCl_{2}(PPh_{3})_{2} is strictly square planar.
- Stryker's reagent, [(PPh_{3})CuH]_{6}, is a PPh_{3}-stabilized transition metal hydride cluster used as a reagent for "conjugate reductions".
- (Triphenylphosphine)iron tetracarbonyl (Fe(CO)_{4}(PPh_{3})) and bis(triphenylphosphine)iron tricarbonyl (Fe(CO)_{3}(PPh_{3})_{2}), illustrative of numerous phosphine-substituted metal carbonyl complexes.

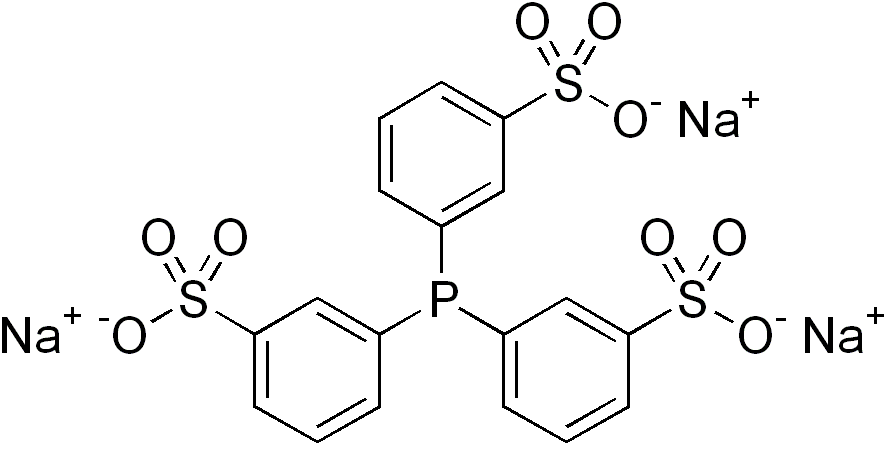
3,3′,3″-Phosphanetriyltris(benzenesulfonic acid) trisodium salt forms water-soluble complexes.

== Complexes of other organophosphorus ligands ==
The popularity and usefulness of phosphine complexes has led to the popularization of complexes of many related organophosphorus ligands. Complexes of arsines have also been widely investigated, but are avoided in practical applications because of concerns about toxicity.

=== Complexes of primary and secondary phosphines ===
Most work focuses on complexes of triorganophosphines, but primary and secondary phosphines, respectively RPH_{2} and R_{2}PH, also function as ligands. Such ligands are less basic and smaller. These complexes are susceptible to deprotonation leading to phosphido-bridged dimers and oligomers:

2 L_{n}M(PR_{2}H)Cl → [L_{n}M(μ-PR_{2})]_{2} + 2 HCl

=== Complexes of PR_{x}(OR')_{3−x} ===
Nickel(0) complexes of phosphites, e.g., Ni[P(OEt)_{3}]_{4} are useful catalysts for hydrocyanation of alkenes. Related complexes are known for phosphinites (R_{2}P(OR')) and phosphonites (RP(OR')_{2}).

=== Diphosphine complexes ===
Due to the chelate effect, ligands with two phosphine groups bind more tightly to metal centers than do two monodentate phosphines. The conformational properties of diphosphines makes them especially useful in asymmetric catalysis, e.g. Noyori asymmetric hydrogenation. Several diphosphines have been developed, prominent examples include 1,2-bis(diphenylphosphino)ethane (dppe) and 1,1'-Bis(diphenylphosphino)ferrocene (dppf), and the trans spanning xantphos and spanphos. The complex dichloro(1,3-bis(diphenylphosphino)propane)nickel is useful in Kumada coupling.

== See also ==
- Transition metal trifluorophosphine complexes
