= Concurrent tandem catalysis =

Chemistry technique

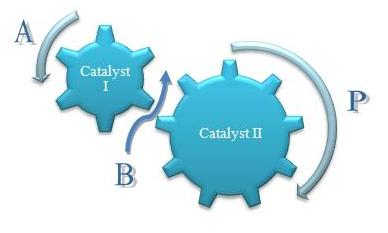
Scheme 1

Concurrent tandem catalysis (CTC) is a technique in chemistry where multiple catalysts (usually two) produce a product otherwise not accessible by a single catalyst. It is usually practiced as homogeneous catalysis. Scheme 1 illustrates this process. Molecule A enters this catalytic system to produce the comonomer, B, which along with A enters the next catalytic process to produce the final product, P. This one-pot approach can decrease product loss from isolation or purification of intermediates. Reactions with relatively unstable products can be generated as intermediates because they are only transient species and are immediately used in a consecutive reaction.

== Introduction ==
The major advantage of using CTC is it requires a single molecule; however, the required reaction conditions and catalyst compatibility are major hurdles. The system must be thoroughly studied to find the optimal conditions for both the catalysis and reactant to produce the desired product. Occasionally, a trade-off must be made between several competing effects.

The desire of getting better yields and selectivity is of interest to many in academia and the industry. In this one-pot system, intermediate purification is unnecessary, so the risk of unwanted products and side reactions are more probable. Matching compatible catalysts would eliminate the likelihood of a catalyst starving or saturating the system, which may cause the catalyst to decompose or generate unwanted side reactions. If side products were to be generated, it may be capable of interfering with the catalytic system. Thus in-depth knowledge is required of the mechanistic characteristics of both catalytic processes and the activity of the catalysts. Kinetic measurements are a crucial instrument in the development of CTC processes.

== Scope ==
=== Polymerization ===
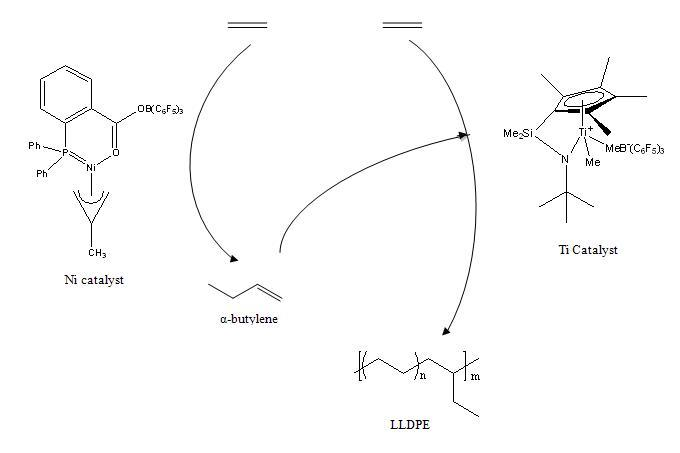

One of the simplest and most thoroughly studied polymers arises from the polymerization of ethylene. Linear low-density polyethylene, LLDPE, is of industrial importance and is currently produced on the macro- scale; millions of tons per year. Branching of polyethylene involves the oligomerization of ethylene into alpha-olefins, carried out by one catalyst, followed by ethylene polymerization using the α-olefins as co-monomer, carried out by a second catalyst. This system suffers in practice.

Electrophilic boranes activate the chelated nickel catalyst to oligomerize ethylene into α-butylene. In the same pot a titanium catalyst polymerizes ethylene and the α-olefin to form LLDPE. The degree of branching was found to increase linearly with the increase in concentration of the nickel catalyst.

=== Metathesis ===
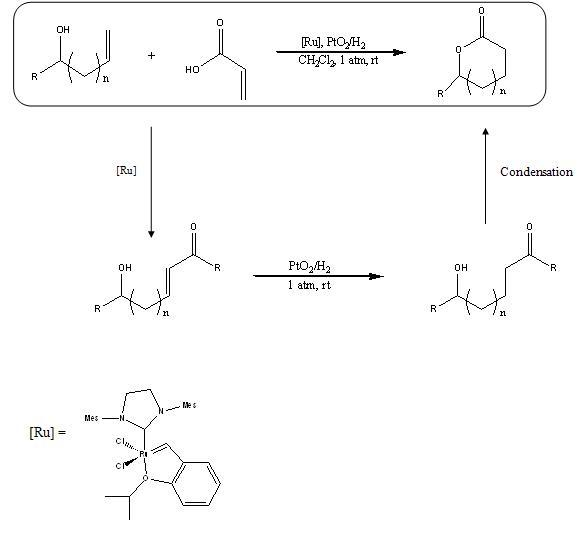

Metathesis has been a powerful tool in the coupling of olefins for several decades. The ability to rearrange carbon-carbon double bonds has provided great utility in all aspects of organic chemistry. Cossy et al. report a simple synthesis to form substituted five and six membered lactones from the cross metathesis of an allylic or homoallylic alcohol and acrylic acid using a ruthenium based metathesis catalyst. Lactones are good synthetic starting points for many natural products and are prevalent structures in biology therefore they are widely utilized in pharmaceuticals.

=== Carbonylation ===
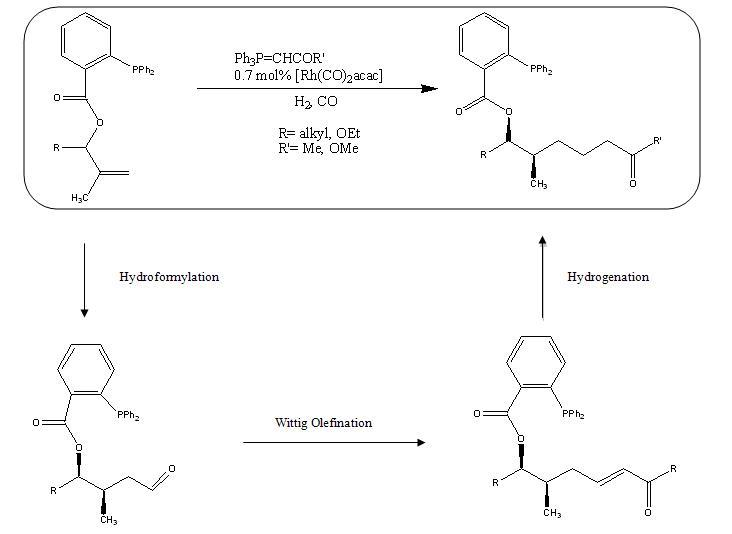

One of the most studied and commercially important transition metal catalyzed reactions is alkene hydroformylation. This type of catalysis allows for the functionalization of simple alkenes into aldehydes and gives a remarkably useful handle to generate other functional groups. This transformation can be carried out using a cobalt or rhodium catalyst in a hydrogen/carbon monoxide atmosphere and consists of four stages: metal insertion, migratory insertion, heterolytic cleavage, and ligand exchange. Breit et al. generated extended alkane functionality by hydroformylation, olefination, and then hydrogenation.

=== Orthogonal tandem catalysis ===
Orthogonal tandem catalysis is a "one-pot reaction in which sequential catalytic processes occur through two or more functionally distinct, and preferably non-interfering, catalytic cycles". This technique has been deployed in tandem alkane-dehydrogenation-olefin-metathesis catalysis

=== Photoprotection tandem catalysis ===
Recently, tandem catalysis mechanism is proposed for significant photoprotection of dye, pigment, and polymers in paints and coatings when cerium carbonate is used together with photoactive metal oxide like titanium oxide.

== See also ==
- Chain shuttling polymerization
