= Ruhrchemie =

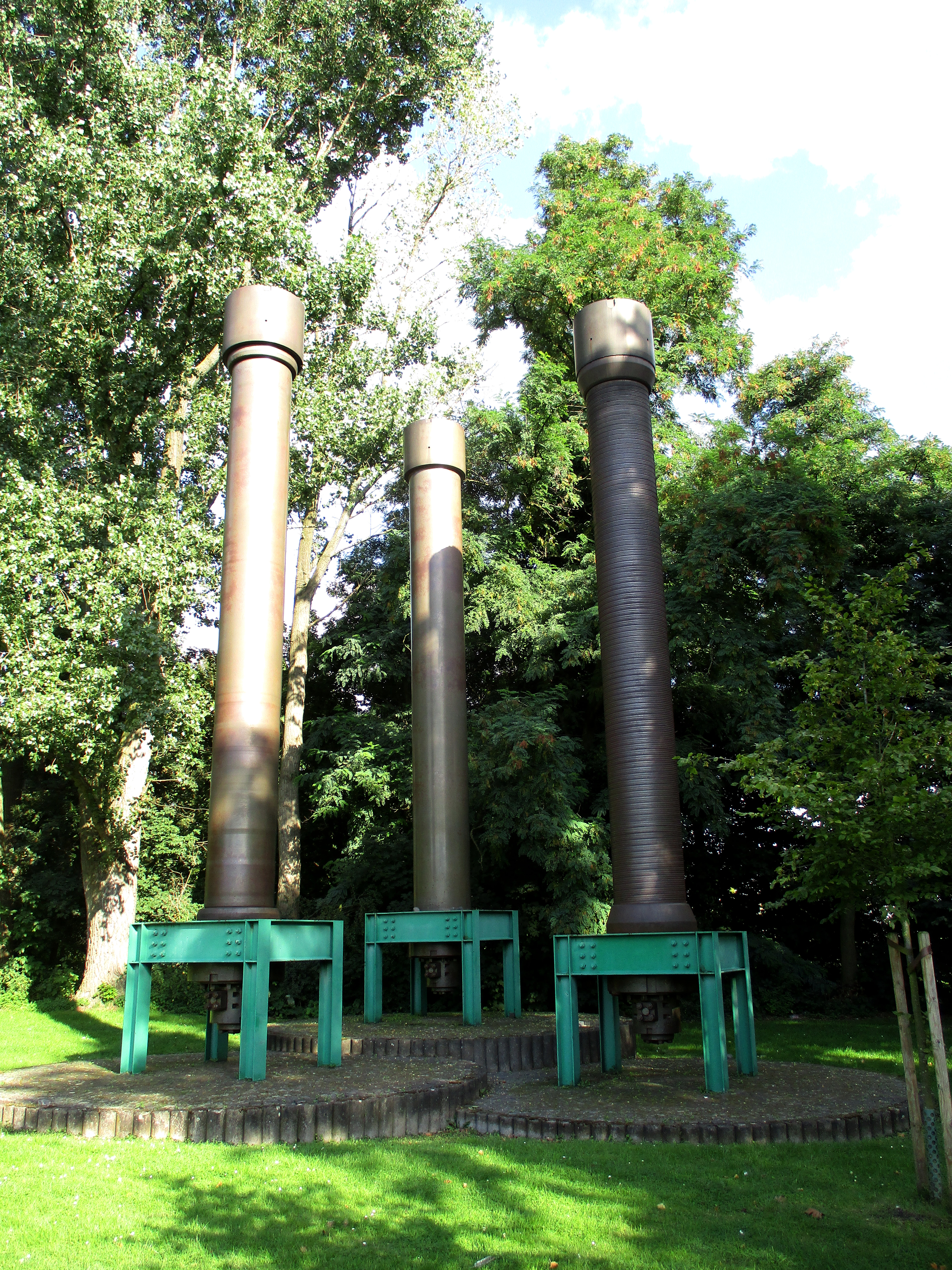
Historic ammonia reactors at the Ruhrchemie factory

Ruhrchemie is a chemical company founded in 1927/28. The company, based in the Holten district of Oberhausen, is now the German headquarters of the OQ (company). It is now formally known as OQ Werk Ruhrchemie.

== History ==
For a short time at the beginning of the 20th century, one of the first German airports seemed to be built in the Holtener Bruch, which had been largely drained by the canalization of the Emscher river. However, it remained with air shows and training flights; the course and outcome of the First World War prevented the airport project from being realized. Instead, the area was used for industrial purposes at the end of the 1920s.

The company was founded in 1927 by numerous Ruhr mining companies as de:Kohlechemie AG. It was renamed Ruhrchemie AG in April 1928 and began producing fertilizers at the Holten site in 1929. In 1936, the first plant for the production of liquid hydrocarbons using the Fischer-Tropsch process went into operation.

In 1938, Otto Roelen developed the oxo synthesis of aldehydes, which are used to produce polyols, carboxylic acids, esters and solvents, among other things.

After 1945, the Allies banned the production of synthetic fuels and dismantled the corresponding plants, which had been badly damaged in the war. This led to a shift in production focus from coal to petrochemicals in the early 1950s.

In 1958, Farbwerke Hoechst acquired an initial 25 percent stake in Ruhrchemie. The shareholding was gradually increased to two thirds in the 1960s and 1970s. In 1960, the production of high-density polyethylene (HDPE) began, and in 1972, low-density polyethylene (LDPE).

In 1977, a large-scale test plant for coal gasification was built as a joint project between Ruhrchemie and Ruhrkohle AG; in 1986, the Ruhr synthetic gas plant was commissioned.

In 1984, Hoechst took over the remaining shares of Ruhrchemie and incorporated them as the Ruhrchemie plant.

Fertilizer production was shut down in 1990.

In 1998, in preparation for the merger with Rhône-Poulenc to form Aventis, Hoechst combined certain chemical activities, including Ruhrchemie, and spun them off into Hoechst Celanese Corporation, which it had merged with its American subsidiary, American Hoechst, in 1987 after acquiring the Celanese Corporation for $2.85 billion.

From 2007 to 2020 it was part of Oxea GmbH, which was formed in March 2007 from the merger of European Oxo and selected business units of Celanese Chemicals. In November 2013 Oxea was sold to the Oman Oil Company. After Oxea was renamed OQ Chemicals in mid-May 2020, the plant is officially called OQ Werk Ruhrchemie.

The current plant site has an area of around 1.2 km². The focus of the product range is oxo intermediates & oxo derivatives. The number of employees is around 1,065, after temporarily reaching more than 3,000 in the 1940s and 1950s.

Industry makes a city theme route on the Route of Industrial Heritage. On September 24, 2013, the German Chemical Society (GDCh) installed a memorial plaque entitled Historical Sites of Chemistry in memory of Otto Roelen.
