= Hydridotetrakis(triphenylphosphine)rhodium(I) =

Identifiers
CAS Number	18284-36-1
3D model (JSmol)	Interactive image
ChemSpider	23089353
ECHA InfoCard	100.153.466
EC Number	624-922-3
CompTox Dashboard (EPA)	DTXSID50719953
- InChI: InChI=1S/4C18H15P.Rh.H/c4*1-4-10-16(11-5-1)19(17-12-6-2-7-13-17)18-14-8-3-9-15-18;;/h4*1-15H;; Key: QTTJMGBPWXLZKV-UHFFFAOYSA-N
- SMILES: C1=CC=C(C=C1)P(C2=CC=CC=C2)C3=CC=CC=C3.C1=CC=C(C=C1)P(C2=CC=CC=C2)C3=CC=CC=C3.C1=CC=C(C=C1)P(C2=CC=CC=C2)C3=CC=CC=C3.C1=CC=C(C=C1)P(C2=CC=CC=C2)C3=CC=CC=C3.[Rh][H]

Properties
Chemical formula	C_{72}H_{61}P_{4}Rh
Molar mass	1153.12
Appearance	yellow solid
Density	1.328 g/cm^{3}
Melting point	162–163 °C (324–325 °F; 435–436 K)

Hazards
- GHS labelling
Pictograms	(GHS07: Exclamation mark)
Signal word	Warning
Hazard statements	H315, H319, H335
Precautionary statements	P261, P264, P271, P280, P302+P352, P304+P340, P305+P351+P338, P312, P321, P332+P313, P337+P313, P362, P403+P233, P405, P501
- Except where otherwise noted, data are given for materials in their standard state (at 25 °C [77 °F], 100 kPa). Infobox references

Hydridotetrakis(triphenylphosphine)rhodium(I) is the coordination complex with the formula HRh[P(C_{6}H_{5})_{3}]_{4}. It consists of a Rh(I) center complexed to four triphenylphosphine (PPh_{3}) ligands and one hydride. The molecule has idealized C_{3v} symmetry. The compound is a homogeneous catalyst for hydrogenation and related reactions. It is a yellow solid that dissolves in aromatic solvents.

== Preparation ==
In the presence of base, H_{2}, and additional triphenylphosphine, Wilkinson's catalyst (chloridotris(triphenylphosphane)rhodium(I)) converts to HRh(PPh_{3})_{4}:

RhCl(PPh_{3})_{3} + H_{2} + KOH + PPh_{3} → RhH(PPh_{3})_{4} + H_{2}O + KCl
