= Xantphos =

- Ph stands for phenyl

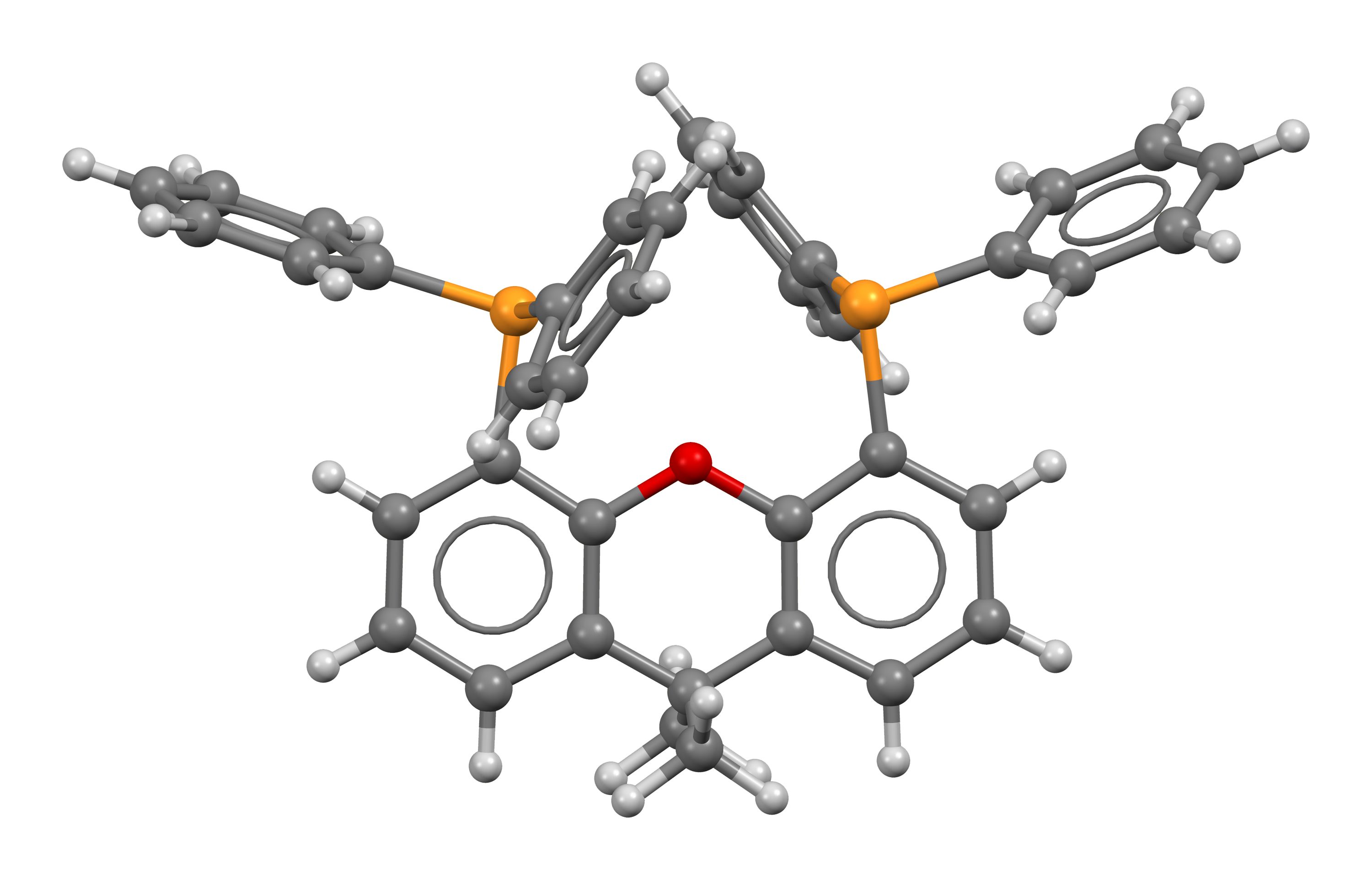

Names
- Preferred IUPAC name (9,9-Dimethyl-9H-xanthene-4,5-diyl)bis(diphenylphosphane)
- Other names Xantphos

Identifiers
CAS Number	161265-03-8
3D model (JSmol)	Interactive image
ChemSpider	551930
ECHA InfoCard	100.118.008
PubChem CID	636044
UNII	NMU72MOG9B
CompTox Dashboard (EPA)	DTXSID20348350
- InChI: InChI=1S/C39H32OP2/c1-39(2)33-25-15-27-35(41(29-17-7-3-8-18-29)30-19-9-4-10-20-30)37(33)40-38-34(39)26-16-28-36(38)42(31-21-11-5-12-22-31)32-23-13-6-14-24-32/h3-28H,1-2H3 Key: CXNIUSPIQKWYAI-UHFFFAOYSA-N; InChI=1/C39H32OP2/c1-39(2)33-25-15-27-35(41(29-17-7-3-8-18-29)30-19-9-4-10-20-30)37(33)40-38-34(39)26-16-28-36(38)42(31-21-11-5-12-22-31)32-23-13-6-14-24-32/h3-28H,1-2H3 Key: CXNIUSPIQKWYAI-UHFFFAOYAQ
- SMILES: O6c1c(cccc1P(c2ccccc2)c3ccccc3)C(c7cccc(P(c4ccccc4)c5ccccc5)c67)(C)C

Properties
Chemical formula	C_{39}H_{32}OP_{2}
Molar mass	578.62 g/mol
Appearance	colorless solid
Density	1.34 g/mL
Melting point	224 to 228 °C (435 to 442 °F; 497 to 501 K)
Solubility in water	organic solvents

Hazards
- Occupational safety and health (OHS/OSH)
Main hazards	flammable
- Except where otherwise noted, data are given for materials in their standard state (at 25 °C [77 °F], 100 kPa). verify (what is ?) Infobox references

Xantphos is an organophosphorus compound derived from the heterocycle xanthene. It is used as a bidentate diphosphine ligand and is noteworthy for having a particularly wide bite angle (108°). Such ligands are useful in the hydroformylation of alkenes. Illustrative of its wide bite angle, it forms both cis and trans adducts of platinum(II) chloride. In the latter context, xantphos is classified as a trans-spanning ligand. A related bidentate ligand with a greater bite angle is spanphos.

The ligand is prepared by double directed lithiation of 9,9-dimethylxanthene with sec-butyllithium followed by treatment with chlorodiphenylphosphine.
