= Bis(triphenylphosphine)iron tricarbonyl =

Identifiers
CAS Number	21255-52-7
3D model (JSmol)	Interactive image
ChemSpider	4807608
PubChem CID	6097100
- InChI: InChI=1S/2C18H15P.3CO.Fe/c2*1-4-10-16(11-5-1)19(17-12-6-2-7-13-17)18-14-8-3-9-15-18;3*1-2;/h2*1-15H;;;; Key: NPCXYZUUVGQEGS-UHFFFAOYSA-N
- SMILES: [C-]#[O+].[C-]#[O+].[C-]#[O+].C1=CC=C(C=C1)P(C2=CC=CC=C2)C3=CC=CC=C3.C1=CC=C(C=C1)P(C2=CC=CC=C2)C3=CC=CC=C3.[Fe]

Properties
Chemical formula	C_{39}H_{30}FeO_{3}P_{2}
Molar mass	664.459 g·mol^{−1}
Appearance	yellow solid
Melting point	262–266 °C (504–511 °F; 535–539 K) decomp
- Except where otherwise noted, data are given for materials in their standard state (at 25 °C [77 °F], 100 kPa). Infobox references

Tricarbonylbis(triphenylphosphine)iron(0) is a coordination complex with the formula Fe(CO)_{3}(PPh_{3})_{2} (Ph = C_{6}H_{5}). A yellow solid, this complex is derived from iron pentacarbonyl by replacement of two carbonyl ligands by triphenylphosphine (PPh_{3}).

== Synthesis and reactions ==
The title complex can be prepared by reaction of triiron dodecacarbonyl with excess triphenylphosphine:

Fe_{3}(CO)_{12} + 6 P(C_{6}H_{5})_{3} → 3 Fe(CO)_{3}(P(C_{6}H_{5})_{3})_{2} + 3 CO

(Triphenylphosphine)iron tetracarbonyl is an intermediate in the synthesis of this compound. The title complex can also be produced more efficiently by borohydride-catalyzed substitution of iron pentacarbonyl.

Protonation gives the ferrous hydride:

Fe(CO)_{3}(P(C_{6}H_{5})_{3})_{2} + HBF_{4} → [HFe(CO)_{3}(P(C_{6}H_{5})_{3})_{2}]BF_{4}

Both the mono- and bis(triphenylphosphine) complexes were originally described by Walter Reppe.
