= Otto Roelen =

German chemist (1897–1993)

- Born: 22 March 1897; Mülheim, Germany
- Died: 30 January 1993 (aged 95); Bad Honnef, Germany
- Education: University of Stuttgart
- Occupation: chemist
- Known for: described the construction, operation and yields of oxo synthesis plants
- Notable work: chief chemist for Ruhrchemie during World War II
- Awards: Adolf von Baeyer prize

Otto Roelen (22 March 1897 – 30 January 1993) was a German chemist who pioneered using carbon monoxide to synthesize of organic compounds.

Roelen was born in Mülheim, Germany and studied chemistry and graduated in 1922 from Technische Hochschule Stuttgart. He worked with Franz Fischer and Hans Tropsch at the Kaiser Wilhelm Institute for Coal Research from 1922. He developed the homogeneously catalysed hydroformylation process (also known as "oxo synthesis") for the industrial synthesis of aldehydes from alkenes and carbon monoxide.

During the Second World War he was chief chemist for Ruhrchemie. After the war he described the construction, operation and yields of oxo synthesis plants in detail to British Department of Scientific and Industrial Research interrogators.

Roelen was awarded the Adolf von Baeyer prize by the Gesellschaft Deutscher Chemiker in 1963. In his honor, DECHEMA named the Otto Roelen prize after him.

He died in Bad Honnef, Germany, at the age of 95.
