= Triiron dodecacarbonyl =

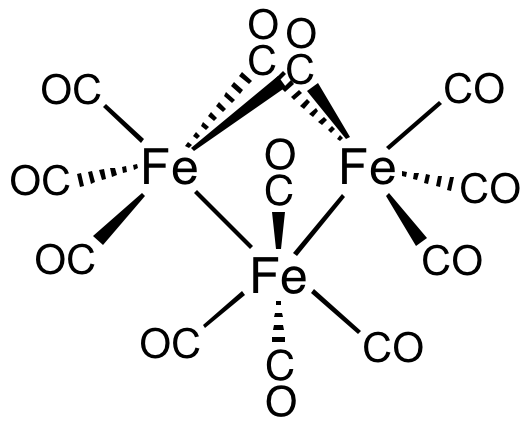

Names
- IUPAC names dodecarbonyltriiron, tetra-μ-carbonyl-1:2κ^{4}C,1:3κ^{2}C,2:3κ^{2}C-octacarbonyl-1κ^{3}C,2κ^{3}C,3κ^{2}C-triangulo-triiron(3 Fe—Fe)
- Other names Iron tetracarbonyl trimer

Identifiers
CAS Number	17685-52-8
3D model (JSmol)	Interactive image
ChemSpider	22439569
ECHA InfoCard	100.037.864
EC Number	241-668-5
PubChem CID	519467
- InChI: InChI=1S/12CO.3Fe/c12*1-2;;; Key: HLYRMDDXFDINCB-UHFFFAOYSA-N
- SMILES: [C-]#[O+].[C-]#[O+].[C-]#[O+].[C-]#[O+].[C-]#[O+].[C-]#[O+].[C-]#[O+].[C-]#[O+].[C-]#[O+].[C-]#[O+].[C-]#[O+].[C-]#[O+].[Fe].[Fe].[Fe]

Properties
Chemical formula	Fe_{3}(CO)_{12}
Molar mass	503.66 g/mol
Appearance	dark black/green crystals
Melting point	165 °C (329 °F; 438 K)
Boiling point	decomposes
Solubility in water	insoluble

Structure
Point group	C_{2v}

Hazards
- GHS labelling
Pictograms	(GHS02: Flammable) (GHS06: Toxic) (GHS07: Exclamation mark) (GHS08: Health hazard)
Signal word	Warning
Hazard statements	H228, H302, H312, H331, H332, H371

Related compounds
Other cations	Triruthenium dodecacarbonyl Triosmium dodecacarbonyl
Related iron carbonyls	Iron pentacarbonyl Diiron nonacarbonyl
- Except where otherwise noted, data are given for materials in their standard state (at 25 °C [77 °F], 100 kPa). verify (what is ?) Infobox references

Triiron dodecacarbonyl is the organoiron compound with the formula Fe_{3}(CO)_{12}. It is a dark green solid that sublimes under vacuum. It is soluble in nonpolar organic solvents to give intensely green solutions. Most low-nuclearity clusters are pale yellow or orange. Hot solutions of Fe_{3}(CO)_{12} decompose to an iron mirror, which can be pyrophoric in air. The solid decomposes slowly in air, and thus samples are typically stored cold under an inert atmosphere. It is a more reactive source of iron(0) than iron pentacarbonyl.

== Synthesis ==
It was one of the first metal carbonyl clusters synthesized. It was occasionally obtained from the thermolysis of Fe(CO)_{5}:

3 Fe(CO)_{5} → Fe_{3}(CO)_{12} + 3 CO

Traces of the compound are easily detected because of its characteristic deep green colour. UV-photolysis of Fe(CO)_{5} produces Fe_{2}(CO)_{9}, not Fe_{3}(CO)_{12}.

The usual synthesis of Fe_{3}(CO)_{12} starts with the reaction of Fe(CO)_{5} with base:

3 Fe(CO)_{5} + (C_{2}H_{5})_{3}N + 2 H_{2}O → [(C_{2}H_{5})_{3}NH][HFe_{3}(CO)_{11}] + H_{2} + 2 CO + 2 CO_{2}

followed by protonation of the resulting hydrido cluster with acid:

12 [(C_{2}H_{5})_{3}NH][HFe_{3}(CO)_{11}] + 18 HCl → 11 Fe_{3}(CO)_{12} + 15 H_{2} + 3 FeCl_{2} + 12 [(C_{2}H_{5})_{3}NH]Cl

The original synthesis by Walter Hieber et al. entailed the oxidation of H_{2}Fe(CO)_{4} with manganese dioxide. The cluster was originally formulated incorrectly as "Fe(CO)_{4}".

== Structure ==
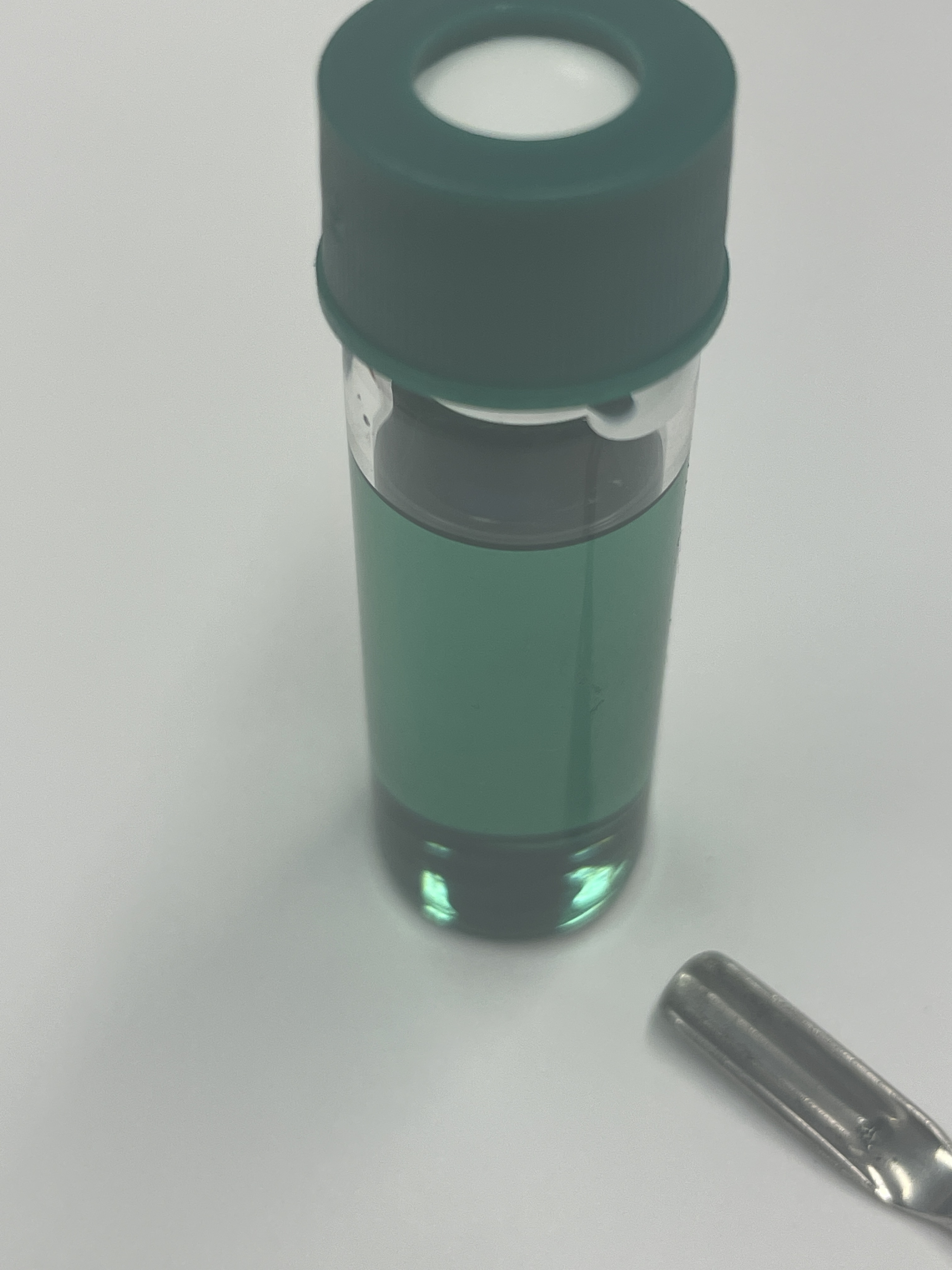
Saturated solution of Fe_{3}(CO)_{12} in mesitylene.

Elucidation of the structure of Fe_{3}(CO)_{12} proved to be challenging because the CO ligands are disordered in the crystals. Early evidence for its distinctive C_{2v} structure came from Mössbauer spectroscopic measurements that revealed two quadrupole doublets with similar isomer shifts but different (1.13 and 0.13 mm s^{−1}) quadrupolar coupling constants.

Fe_{3}(CO)_{12} consists of a triangle of iron atoms surrounded by 12 CO ligands. Ten of the CO ligands are terminal and two span an Fe---Fe edge, resulting in C_{2v} point group symmetry. By contrast, Ru_{3}(CO)_{12} and Os_{3}(CO)_{12} adopt D_{3h}-symmetric structures, wherein all 12 CO ligands are terminally bound to the metals. In solution Fe_{3}(CO)_{12} is fluxional, resulting in equivalencing all 12 CO groups on the ^{13}C NMR timescale.

The anion [HFe_{3}(CO)_{11}]^{−} is structurally related to Fe_{3}(CO)_{12}, with the hydride replacing one bridging CO ligand. The bonding in the Fe-H-Fe subunit is described using concepts developed for diborane.

== Reactions ==
Solutions of Fe_{3}(CO)_{12} reacts with triphenylphosphine to give (triphenylphosphine)iron tetracarbonyl (and some bis(triphenylphosphine)iron tricarbonyl).

Fe_{3}(CO)_{12} + 3 P(C_{6}H_{5})_{3} → 3 Fe(CO)_{4}(P(C_{6}H_{5})_{3})

Heating Fe_{3}(CO)_{12} gives a low yield of the carbido cluster Fe_{5}(CO)_{15}C. Such reactions proceed via disproportionation of CO to give CO_{2} and carbon.

Fe_{3}(CO)_{12} forms "ferroles" upon reaction with heterocycles such as thiophenes.

Fe_{3}(CO)_{12} reacts with thiols and disulfides to give thiolate-bridged complexes, such as methylthioirontricarbonyl dimer:

2 Fe_{3}(CO)_{12} + 3 (CH_{3})_{2}S_{2} → 3 [Fe(CO)_{3}SCH_{3}]_{2} + 6 CO. These complexes are studied as hydrogenase mimics.

== Safety ==
Fe_{3}(CO)_{12} is hazardous as a source of carbon monoxide. Solid samples, especially when finely divided, and residues from reactions can be pyrophoric, which can ignite the organic solvents used for such reactions.
