= Transition metal trifluorophosphine complexes =

Transition metal coordination complexes containing one or more trifluorophosphine ligands

Transition metal trifluorophosphine complexes are transition metal coordination complexes containing one or more trifluorophosphine (PF_{3}) ligands. These complexes are a subclass of transition metal-phosphine complexes. Although trifluorophosphine complexes lack commercial applications, they have been of enduring fundamental interest. As one distinctive feature, they form many simple homoleptic complexes with zero-valence metals, more so than does carbon monoxide (CO).

== Ligand properties ==
Trifluorophosphine is classified as an L ligand in the covalent bond classification method. In the usual electron counting method, it is a two-electron ligand. With respect to HSAB theory, it is soft, reflecting its significant properties as a pi-acceptor ligand. The presence of three electronegative fluorine substituents gives rise to relatively low energy P-F σ* orbitals, which are well positioned to overlap with metal-based orbitals of π-symmetry.

== Preparative routes and compounds ==
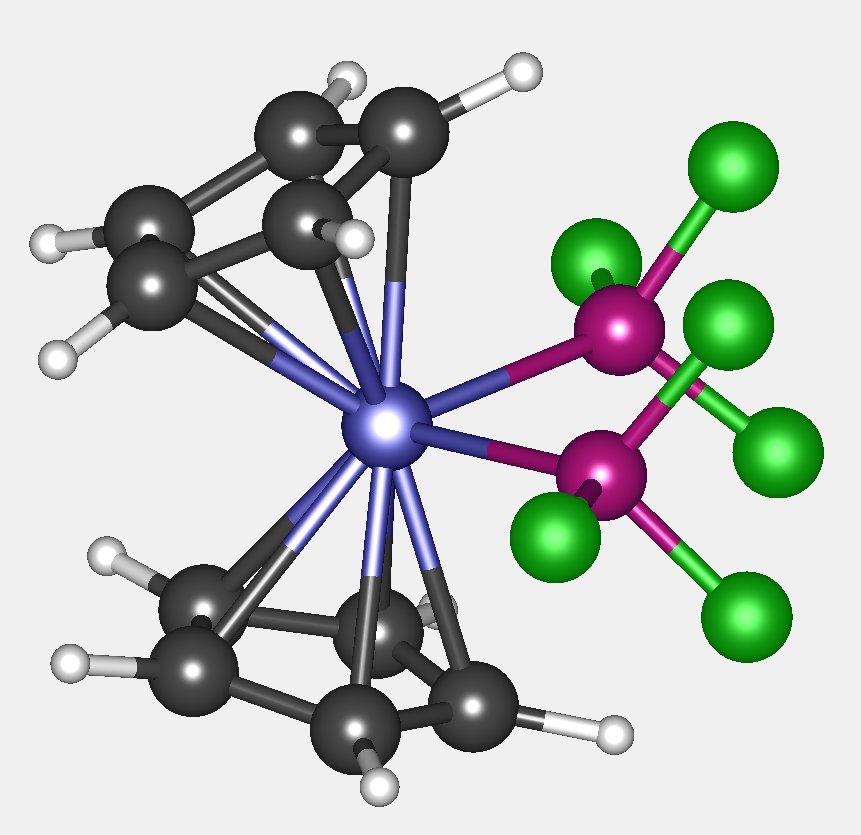
Structure of (C_{5}H_{5})_{2}Ti(PF_{3})_{2}. Color code: green = F, magenta = P, blue = Ti.

Synthetic methodology is complicated by the fact that trifluorophosphine is a highly toxic colorless gas. As the first trifluorophosphine complex to be reported, Ni(PF_{3})_{4}, an analog of Ni(CO)_{4}, was originally prepared by the reaction of Ni(PCl_{3})_{4} with excess PF_{3}, a ligand exchange process. It is a colorless volatile liquid that is stable to water. The same complex can be prepared by combining nickel metal with PF_{3} at 35 MPa pressure and 100 °C. Cr(PF_{3})_{6}, the analogue of Cr(CO)_{6}, can be prepared by displacement of benzene from dibenzenechromium:

Cr(C_{6}H_{6})_{2} + 6 PF_{3} → Cr(PF_{3})_{6} + 2 C_{6}H_{6}

The analogue of iron pentacarbonyl is Fe(PF_{3})_{5}, a yellow volatile solid. It was first prepared by reducing ferrous iodide with zinc under a pressure of trifluorophosphine. The approach is analogous to the reductive carbonylation route to metal carbonyls.

In addition to forming analogs of simple metal carbonyls, trifluorophosphine forms a variety of complexes for which the corresponding CO derivatives are unstable or nonexistent. Thus, Pd(PF_{3})_{4} is known, but Pd(CO)_{4} is not.

== Reactions ==
Photolysis of Fe(PF_{3})_{5} under an atmosphere of hydrogen furnishes the dihydride:

Fe(PF_{3})_{5} + H_{2} → H_{2}Fe(PF_{3})_{4} + PF_{3}

This dihydride is a colorless liquid with a boiling point of 87 °C. By contrast, iron tetracarbonyl dihydride (H_{2}Fe(CO)_{4}) decomposes near its boiling point of -20 °C.
