= Trans-spanning ligand =

Trans-spanning ligands are bidentate ligands that can span opposite sites of a complex with square-planar geometry. A wide variety of ligands that chelate in the cis fashion already exist, but very few can link opposite vertices on a coordination polyhedron. Early attempts to generate trans-spanning bidentate ligands relied on long hydrocarbon chains to link the donor functionalities, but such ligands often lead to coordination polymers.

== History ==
A diphosphane linked with pentamethylene was claimed to span across a square planar complex. This early attempt was followed by ligands with more rigid backbones. "TRANSPHOS" was the first trans-spanning diphosphane ligand that usually coordinates to palladium(II) and platinum(II) in a trans manner. TRANSPHOS features benzo[c]phenanthrene substituted by diphenylphosphinomethyl (Ph_{2}PCH_{2}) groups at the 1 and 11 positions. The polycyclic framework suffers sterically clashing hydrogen centers.

== SPANphos, TRANSDIP, and related ligands ==
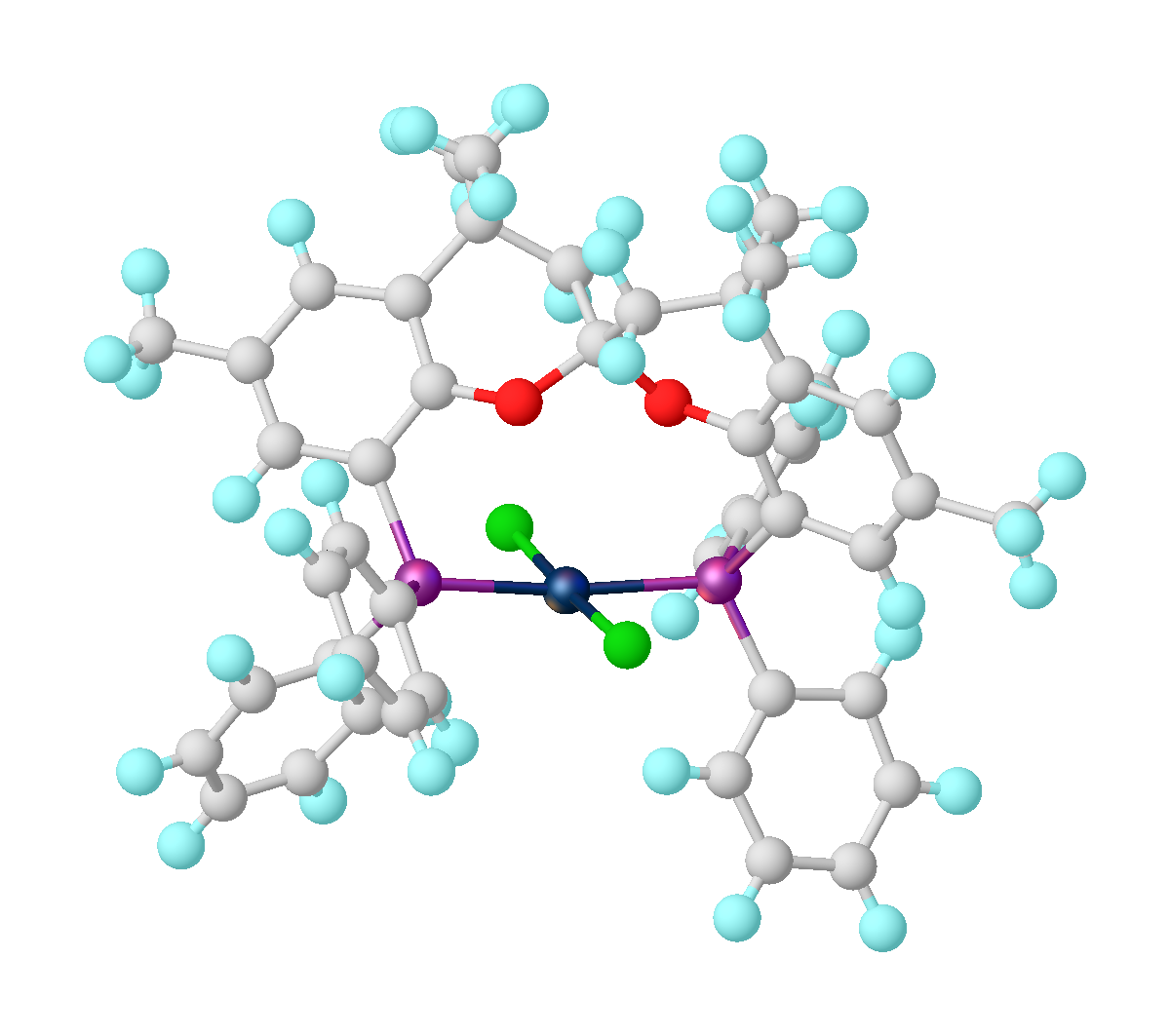
Structure of PtCl_{2}(SPANphos)

TRANSDIP, based on a α-cyclodextrin, is the first ligand to give exclusively trans-spanned complexes, even with d^{8} metal ion halides. Xantphos is sometimes classified as a trans-spanning ligand, with less steric bulk compared to TRANSPHOS. SPANphos is comparable to XANTPHOS but more reliably trans-spanning.
