= Chain shuttling polymerization =

Chain shuttling polymerization is a dual-catalyst method for producing block copolymers with alternating or variable tacticity. The desired effect of this method is to generate hybrid polymers that bear the properties of both polymer chains, such as a high melting point accompanied by high elasticity. It is a relatively new method, the first instance of its use being reported by Arriola et al. in May 2006.

== Olefin polymerization ==
Olefin polymers (such as polypropylene and polyethylene) have seen widespread use in the plastics industry in the past 50 years. A way to enhance the properties of these olefin polymers was first discovered by the scientists Karl Ziegler and Giulio Natta. Ziegler discovered the original Titanium based catalyst essential for olefin polymerization, while Natta used the catalyst to alter and control the stereochemistry (tacticity) of the olefin polymers (hence Ziegler–Natta catalyst). By controlling the tacticity of the polymer, a chain can, for example, either be semi crystalline or amorphous, rigid or elastic, heat resistant or have a low glass transition temperature. Much research since has been dedicated to predicting and creating polymers based on this work. Living polymerization is the term coined to describe the use of specially made catalysts (often involving transition metal centers) in olefin polymerization, since the polymer chains self-propagate in the presence of the catalyst until intentionally terminated.

Living polymerization, however, produces only one type of tacticity per catalyst. While the specific tacticity can be controlled by altering the type of catalyst used, creating a block copolymer requires that the polymerization be terminated, the catalyst destroyed, and that the chain re-propagate using another catalyst that produces the desired stereochemistry. Such manipulations are usually difficult, however.

== Method ==
Chain shuttling polymerization makes use of two catalysts and a chain shuttling agent (CSA) to generate copolymers of alternating tacticity. Catalyst 1 (Cat1) propagates a polyolefin of a desired tacticity. Catalyst 2 (Cat2) generates another chain of a different tacticity. The two chains are allowed to co-propagate in a single reactor in the same living polymer fashion as before. To alternate the tacticity, a CSA will transfer the polymer chain from its respective catalyst. The CSA can then bind to Cat2 and attach the chain to Cat2. When the chain attaches to Cat2, the polymerization of that chain continues, except it now propagates with the tacticity dictated by Cat2, not Cat1. The general result is that the chain will alternate between two different tacticities. As the forward and reverse reactions occur, the polymer chain is “shuttled” back and forth between the two catalysts and a block copolymer is formed.

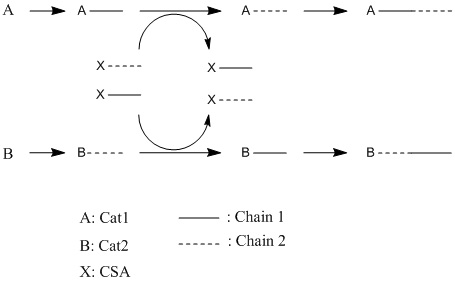
Reaction scheme for chain shuttling polymerization

The shuttling of chains back and forth from catalysts via a CSA can be viewed as a competing chemical equilibrium. Note that the forward and reverse reactions of CSA binding and leaving either Cat1 or Cat2 are possible. This competition means that a chain can leave Cat1 via a CSA and the reattach to Cat1, polymerizing the same tacticity. The rate at which the reattachment of Cat1 occurs can be controlled by altering the relative concentrations of Cat1, Cat2 and CSA. For example, if one wanted to produce a polymer with the properties mainly resulting from the use of Cat1 and only wanted to influence its properties slightly by the presence of Cat2, a greater concentration of Cat1 would be used than for Cat2. The rate of alternation between tacticity can be controlled by altering the concentration of CSA relative to Cat1 and Cat2; having a higher concentration of CSA means that the chains will shuttle back and forth more rapidly, creating shorter units of alternating tacticity.

== Advantages ==
The first clear advantage of chain shuttling is that one can design copolymers with more desirable traits. A polymer that is normally semi crystalline and rigid can be altered so that it has a lower glass transition temperature. An amorphous, elastic polymer membrane can be altered to have a higher melting point. The technique opens the door for tailor-made polymers to be widely accessible and simple to make inexpensively.
