= TPPTS =

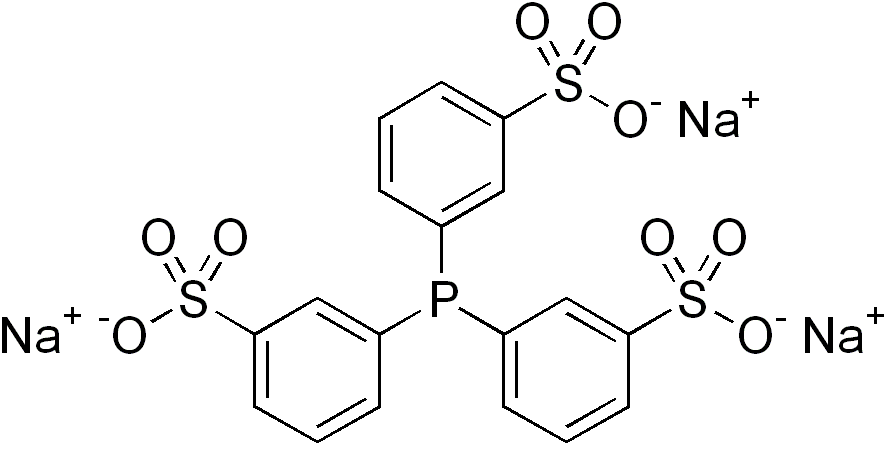

Names
- Preferred IUPAC name Trisodium 3,3′,3′′-phosphanetriyltri(benzene-1-sulfonate)
- Other names: Trisodium 3-bis(3-sulfonatophenyl)phosphanylbenzenesulfonate; 3,3′,3′′-Phosphanetriyltris(benzenesulfonic acid) trisodium salt; Tris(3-sulfophenyl)phosphine trisodium salt

Identifiers
CAS Number	63995-70-0
3D model (JSmol)	Interactive image
ChemSpider	3552062
ECHA InfoCard	100.058.706
EC Number	264-596-6
PubChem CID	4348292
UNII	WUE9W42Q27
CompTox Dashboard (EPA)	DTXSID60213972
- InChI: InChI=1S/C18H15O9PS3.3Na/c19-29(20,21)16-7-1-4-13(10-16)28(14-5-2-8-17(11-14)30(22,23)24)15-6-3-9-18(12-15)31(25,26)27;;;/h1-12H,(H,19,20,21)(H,22,23,24)(H,25,26,27);;;/q;3*+1/p-3 Key: MYAJTCUQMQREFZ-UHFFFAOYSA-K
- SMILES: c1cc(cc(c1)S(=O)(=O)[O-])P(c2cccc(c2)S(=O)(=O)[O-])c3cccc(c3)S(=O)(=O)[O-].[Na+].[Na+].[Na+]

Properties
Chemical formula	C_{18}H_{12}Na_{3}O_{9}PS_{3}
Molar mass	568.41 g·mol^{−1}
Appearance	White microcrystalline solid
Solubility in water	Soluble

Hazards
- GHS labelling
Pictograms	(GHS07: Exclamation mark)
Signal word	Warning
Hazard statements	H315, H319, H335
Precautionary statements	P280, P302+P352, P304+P340, P305+P351+P338, P312, P332+P313, P337+P313
- Except where otherwise noted, data are given for materials in their standard state (at 25 °C [77 °F], 100 kPa). verify (what is ?) Infobox references

3,3′,3′′-Phosphanetriyltris(benzenesulfonic acid) trisodium salt (abbreviated TPPTS), is an organic compound that is also known as sodium triphenylphosphine trisulfonate. The compound has the formula P(C_{6}H_{4}SO_{3}Na)_{3}. This white solid is an unusual example of a water-soluble phosphine. Its complexes are also water-soluble. Its complex with rhodium is used in the industrial production of butyraldehyde.

== Synthesis ==
TPPTS is synthesized by sulfonation of triphenylphosphine. The sulfonation occurs at one meta-position of each of the three phenyl rings. The sulfonation agent is oleum, a solution of sulfur trioxide in sulfuric acid. Immediately upon dissolving in the oleum, the phosphine is protonated. It is the phosphonium salt that undergoes the sulfonation which explains its meta selectivity:

HP(C_{6}H_{5})_{3}^{+} + 3 SO_{3} → [HP(C_{6}H_{4}SO_{3}H)_{3}]^{+}

As a Lewis base, tppts is stronger than triphenylphosphine.

== TPPTS at the origin of two-phase homogeneous catalysis ==
TPPTS was first synthesized in 1975 by E.G Kuntz who was an engineer at Rhône-Poulenc with the aim of carrying out a two-phase homogeneous catalysis in which the aqueous phase catalyst could be easily separated from the reaction products and recycled. Using TPPTS, allowed him to prepare water-soluble complexes with Rh(I), Ni(0), Pd(0). E.G. Kuntz patented several two-phase homogeneous catalytic reactions:

- hydroformylation of propylene with Rh(I) TPPTS, later leading to the Ruhrchemie / Rhône-Poulenc process.
- hydrocyanation of olefins and dienes with Ni(0) TPPTS.
- telomerization of butadiene to 2.7 octadiene -1-ol with Pd(0) TPPTS.
- The Rh(I) TPPTS catalyst was later used by D.Morel to synthesize geranylacetone from myrcene and farnesylacetone from beta-farnesene which are intermediates in the synthesis of vitamin E. This process was industrialized by Rhône-Poulenc in 1988.

The industrial use of TPPTS and homogeneous biphasic catalysis has been reviewed.

== Uses in hydroformylation ==
Complexes of TPPTS are very soluble in water, which is the basis of its industrial application. Tppts-based rhodium catalysts were introduced in 1984 for a two-phase hydroformylation of propene by the Ruhrchemie / Rhône-Poulenc process. Hydroformylation, also known as oxo synthesis, is the reaction of an alkene with carbon monoxide and hydrogen. Traditionally, hydroformylation is catalyzed by rhodium or cobalt complexes in nonaqueous solution The industrial use of Tppts and homogeneous biphasic catalysis were mostly ignored in academic research until E.G. Kuntz published a review of its previous work in 1987. Then, from 1990, use of TPPTS was rapidly become popular with thousand of citations in 2004.
