= Walter Reppe =

German chemist (1892-1969)

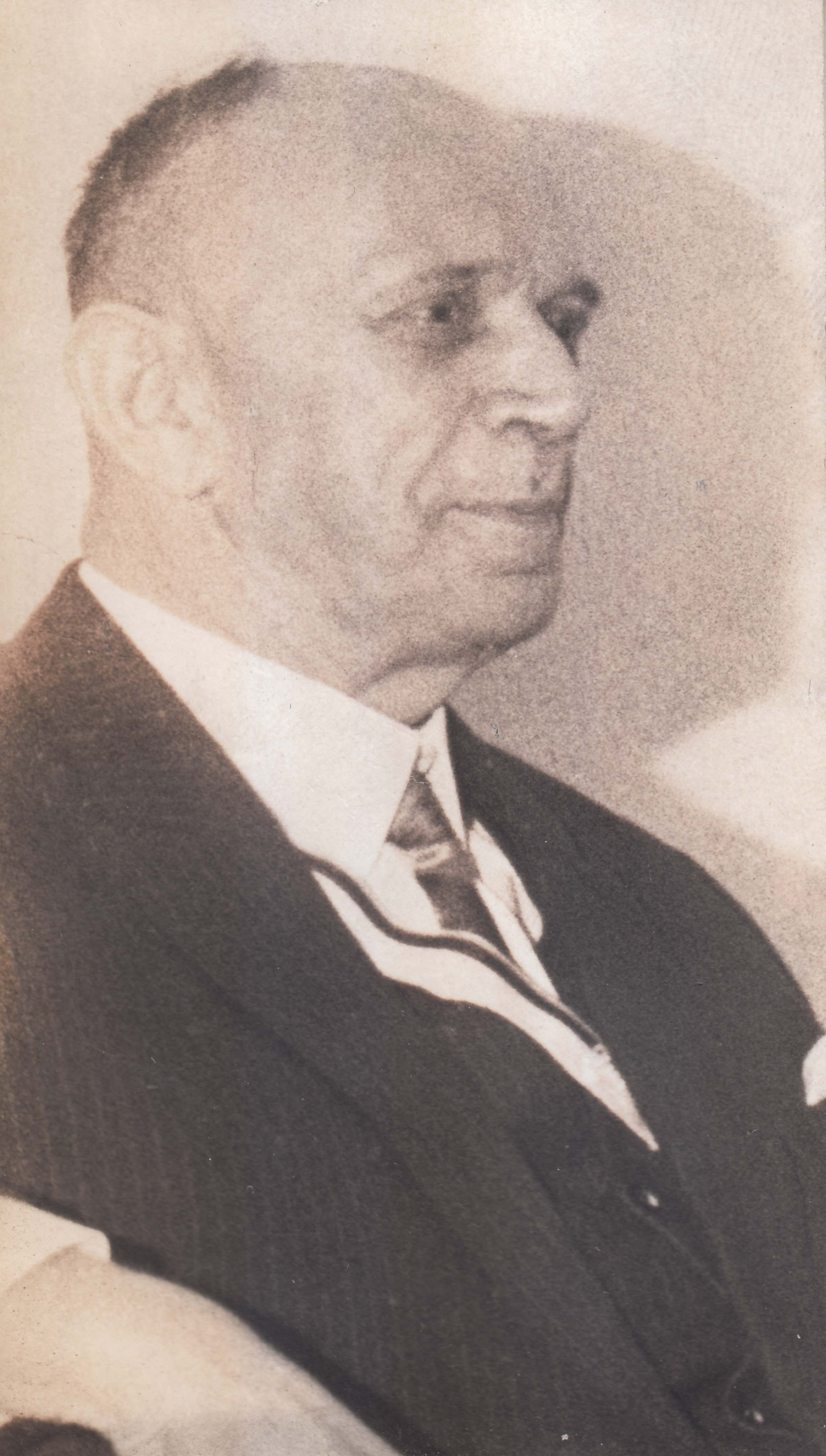
- Born: 29 July 1892; Göringen, German Empire
- Died: 26 July 1969 (aged 76); Heidelberg, West Germany
- Education: University of Jena; Ludwig-Maximilians-Universität München
- Known for: chemistry of acetylene
- Awards: Werner von Siemens Ring (1960)
- Scientific career
- Fields: Chemistry
- Workplaces: BASF; University of Mainz; TH Darmstadt

Walter Julius Reppe (29 July 1892 in Göringen – 26 July 1969 in Heidelberg) was a German chemist. He is notable for his contributions to the chemistry of acetylene.

== Education and career ==
Walter Reppe began his study of the natural sciences University of Jena in 1911. Interrupted by the First World War, he obtained his doctorate at the Ludwig-Maximilians-Universität München in 1920.

In 1921, Reppe worked for BASF's main laboratory. From 1923, he worked on the catalytic dehydration of formamide to prussic acid in the indigo laboratory, developing this procedure for industrial use. In 1924, he left research for 10 years, only resuming it in 1934.

== Acetylene chemistry ==
Reppe began his interest in acetylene in 1928. Acetylene is a gas which can take part in many chemical reactions. However, it is explosive and accidents often occurred. Because of this danger, small quantities of acetylene were used at a time, and always without high pressures. In fact, it was forbidden to compress acetylene over 1.5 bar at BASF.

To work with acetylene safely, Reppe designed special test tubes, the so-called "Reppe glasses" — stainless steel spheres with screw-type cap, which permitted high pressure experiments. The efforts ended finally with numerous interrelated reactions, known as Reppe chemistry.

== "Reppe Chemie" ==
The high pressure reactions catalysed by heavy metal acetylides, especially copper acetylide, or metal carbonyls are called Reppe chemistry. Reactions can be classified into four large classes:

- The vinylization according to the equation:

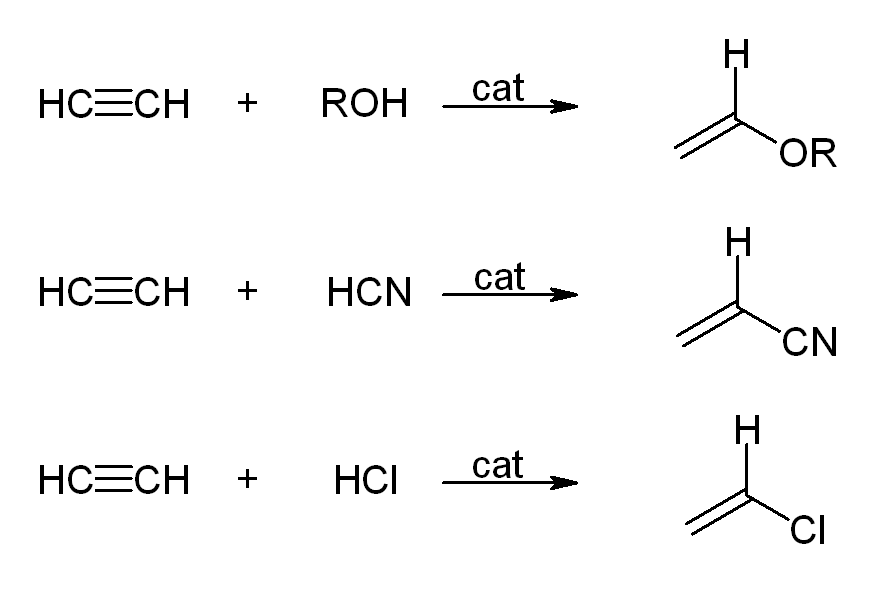

- Catalytic ethynylation of aldehydes (although the milder Favorskii reaction was reported earlier):

- Reactions with carbon monoxide:

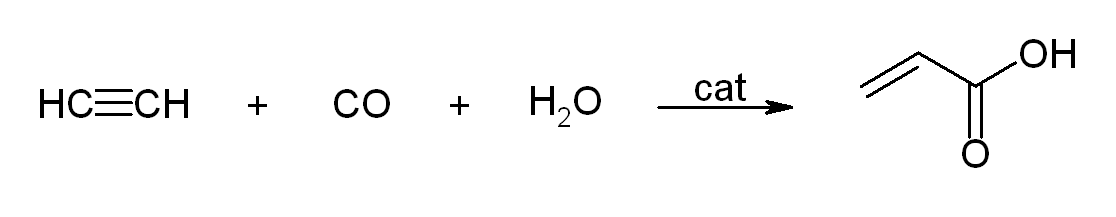

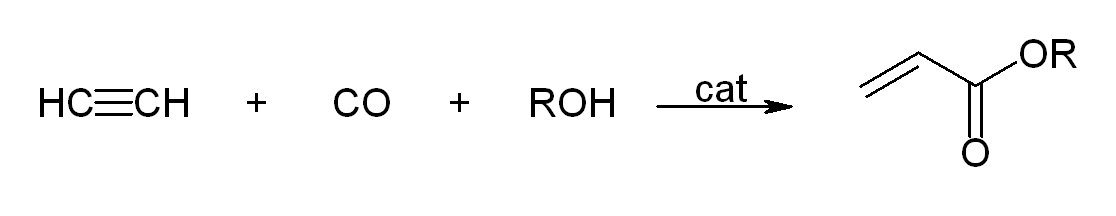

This simple synthesis was used to prepare acrylic acid derivatives for the production of acrylic glass.

- The cyclic polymerization or cyclo-oligomerization of acetylene to cyclooctatetraene, which is one of the most important applications of template reactions. The reaction occurs at a nickel(II) centre, where it is supposed that four acetylene molecules occupy four sites around the metal, and react simultaneously to give the product.

If a competing ligand such as triphenylphosphine is present in sufficient proportion to occupy one coordination site, then room is left for only three acetylene molecules, and these come together to form benzene

This reaction provided an unusual route to benzene and especially to cyclooctatetraene, which was difficult to prepare otherwise.

Products from these four reaction types proved to be versatile intermediates in the syntheses of lacquers, adhesives, foam materials, textile fibers, and pharmaceuticals could now be produced.

== Post-war ==
After the Second World War, Reppe led the research of BASF from 1949 up to his retirement in 1957. From 1952 to 1966, he also sat on the supervisory board. He was also a professor at the University of Mainz and TH Darmstadt from 1951 and 1952 respectively. Together with Otto Bayer and Karl Ziegler he received the Werner von Siemens Ring in 1960 for expanding the scientific knowledge on and for the technical development of new synthetic high-molecular materials.

== Legacy ==
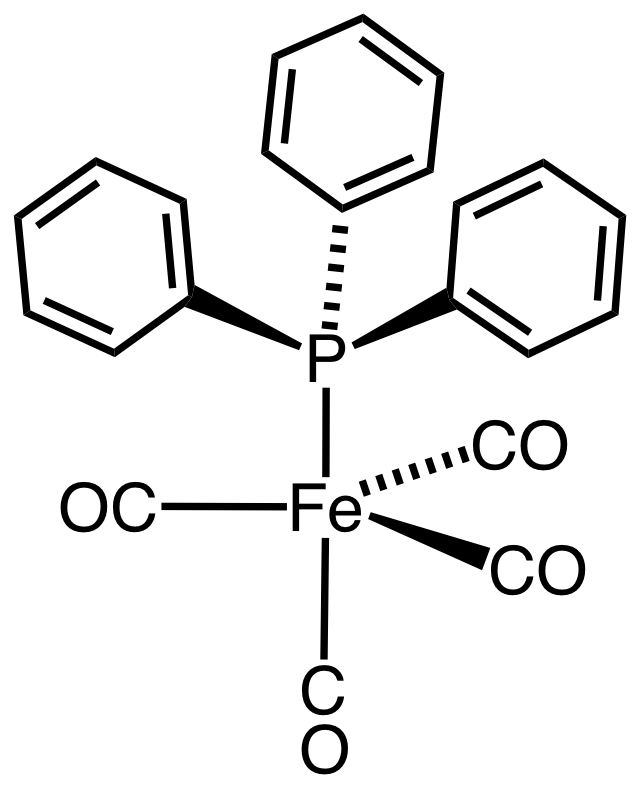
(Triphenylphosphine)iron tetracarbonyl is one of many metal carbonyl catalysts originally described by Reppe.

Most of the industrial processes that were developed by Reppe and coworkers have been superseded, largely because the chemical industry has shifted from coal as feedstock to oil. Alkenes from thermal cracking are readily available, but acetylene is not.

Together with his contemporaries Otto Roelen, Karl Ziegler, Hans Tropsch, and Franz Fischer, Reppe was a leader in demonstrating the utility of metal-catalyzed reactions in large scale synthesis of organic compounds. The economic benefits demonstrated by this research motivated the eventual flowering of organometallic chemistry and its close connection to industry.
