= Wilkinson's catalyst =

Chemical compound

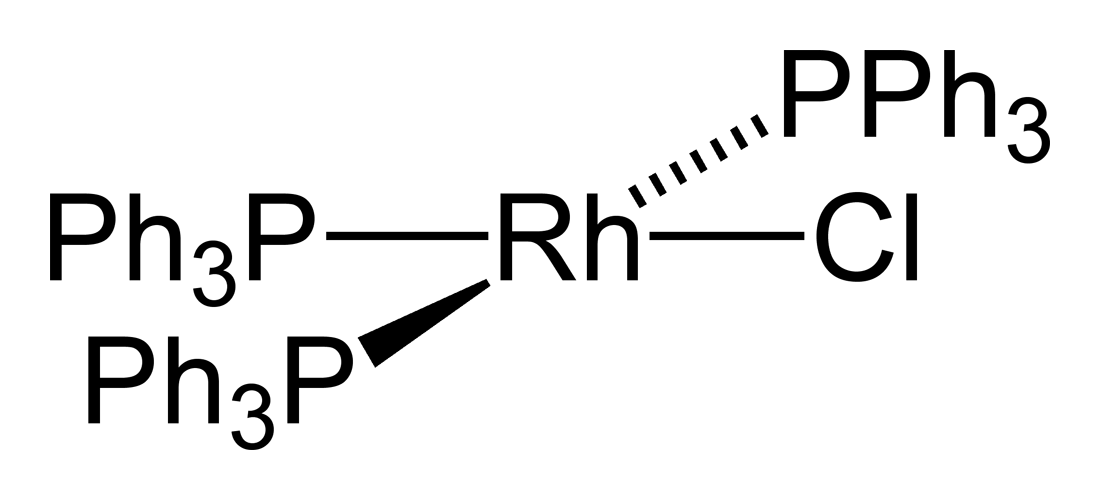
- Wilkinson's catalyst

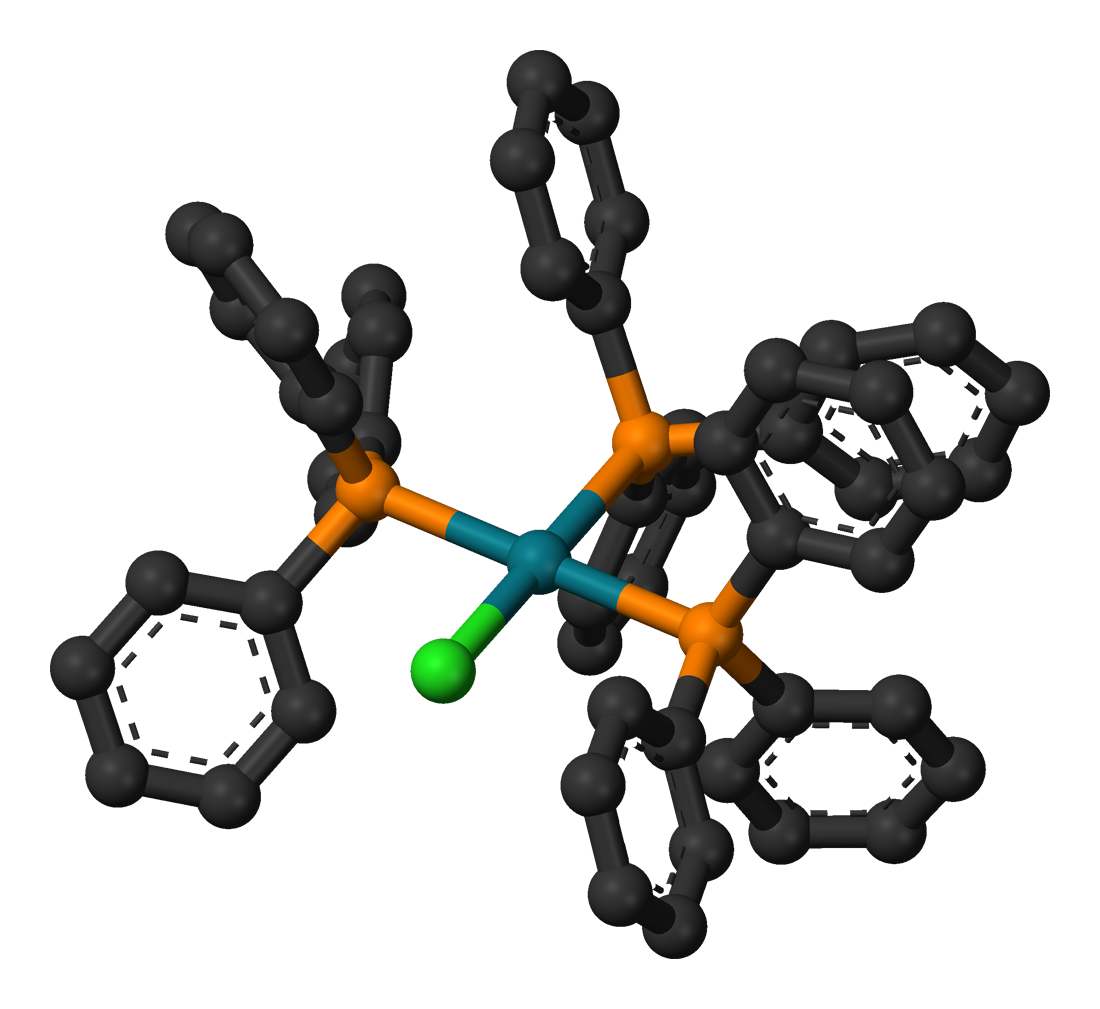
- Wilkinson's catalyst

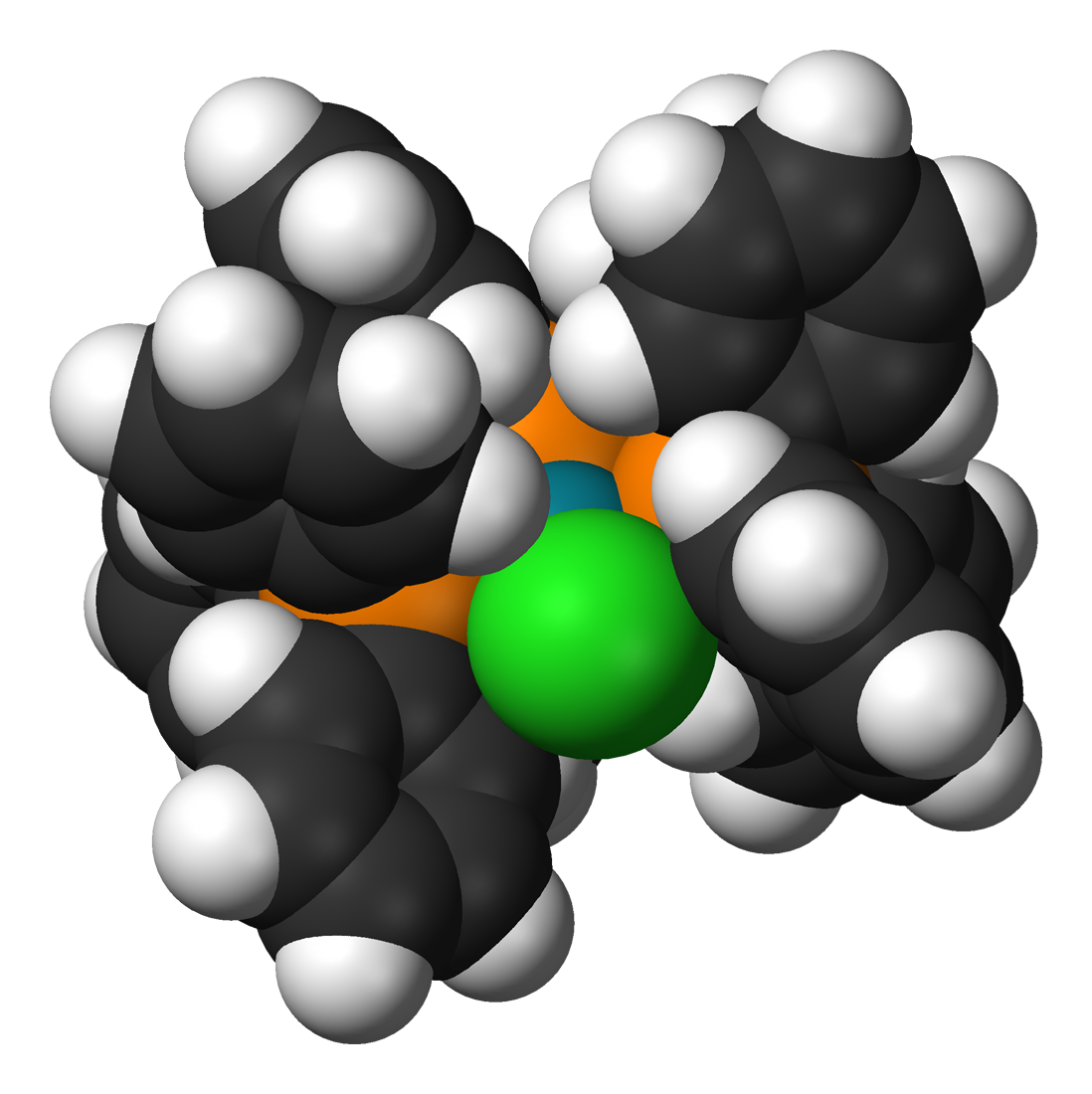
- Wilkinson's catalyst

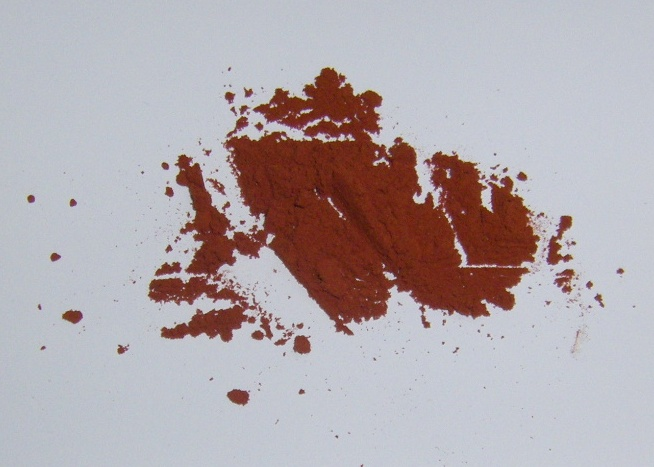
- Wilkinson's

Names
- IUPAC name (SP-4)-chloridotris(triphenylphosphene)rhodium
- Other names Rhodium(I) tris(triphenylphosphene) chloride, Wilkinson's catalyst, Tris(triphenylphosphene)rhodium(I) chloride

Identifiers
CAS Number	14694-95-2
3D model (JSmol)	Interactive image
ChemSpider	30988494
ECHA InfoCard	100.035.207
EC Number	238-744-5
PubChem CID	84599
RTECS number	none
UNII	0FV534BKEV
CompTox Dashboard (EPA)	DTXSID30893902
- InChI: InChI=1S/3C18H15P.ClH.Rh/c3*1-4-10-16(11-5-1)19(17-12-6-2-7-13-17)18-14-8-3-9-15-18;;/h3*1-15H;1H;/p-1 Key: QBERHIJABFXGRZ-UHFFFAOYSA-M
- SMILES: Cl[Rh-3]([P+](c0ccccc0)(c0ccccc0)c0ccccc0)([P+](c0ccccc0)(c0ccccc0)c0ccccc0)[P+](c0ccccc0)(c0ccccc0)c0ccccc0

Properties
Chemical formula	C_{54}H_{45}ClP_{3}Rh
Molar mass	925.22 g/mol
Appearance	red solid
Melting point	245 to 250 °C (473 to 482 °F; 518 to 523 K)
Solubility in water	insoluble in water
Solubility in other solvents	20 g/L (CHCl_{3}, CH_{2}Cl_{2}), 2 g/L (benzene, toluene)

Structure
Coordination geometry	square planar d^{8} (diamagnetic; sp^{2}d-hybridized)

Hazards
- Occupational safety and health (OHS/OSH)
Main hazards	none
- GHS labelling
Pictograms	(GHS07: Exclamation mark)
Signal word	Warning
Hazard statements	H302, H317, H413
Precautionary statements	P261, P264, P270, P272, P273, P280, P301+P312, P302+P352, P330, P333+P313, P363, P501

Related compounds
Related compounds	triphenylphosphene Pd(PPh_{3})_{4} IrCl(CO)[P(C_{6}H_{5})_{3}]_{2}
- Except where otherwise noted, data are given for materials in their standard state (at 25 °C [77 °F], 100 kPa). verify (what is ?) Infobox references

Wilkinson's catalyst (chloridotris(triphenylphosphine)rhodium(I)) is a coordination complex of rhodium with the formula [RhCl(PPh_{3})_{3}], where 'Ph' denotes a phenyl group. It is a red-brown colored solid that is soluble in hydrocarbon solvents such as benzene, and more so in tetrahydrofuran or chlorinated solvents such as dichloromethane. The compound is widely used as a catalyst for hydrogenation of alkenes. It is named after chemist and Nobel laureate Sir Geoffrey Wilkinson, who first popularized its use.

Historically, Wilkinson's catalyst has been a paradigm in catalytic studies leading to several advances in the field such as the implementation of some of the first heteronuclear magnetic resonance studies for its structural elucidation in solution (^{31}P), parahydrogen-induced polarization spectroscopy to determine the nature of transient reactive species, or one of the first detailed kinetic investigation by Halpern to elucidate the mechanism. Furthermore, the catalytic and organometallic studies on Wilkinson's catalyst also played a significant role on the subsequent development of cationic Rh- and Ru-based asymmetric hydrogenation transfer catalysts which set the foundations for modern asymmetric catalysis.

== Structure and basic properties ==
According to single crystal X-ray diffraction the compound adopts a slightly distorted square planar structure.

In analyzing the bonding, it is a complex of Rh(I), a d^{8} transition metal ion. From the perspective of the 18-electron rule, the four ligands each provides two electrons, for a total of 16-electrons. As such the compound is coordinatively unsaturated, i.e. susceptible to binding substrates (alkenes and H_{2}). In contrast, IrCl(PPh_{3})_{3} undergoes cyclometallation to give HIrCl(PPh_{3})_{2}(PPh_{2}C_{6}H_{4}), a coordinatively saturated Ir(III) complex that is not catalytically active.

== Synthesis ==
Wilkinson's catalyst is usually obtained by treating rhodium(III) chloride hydrate with an excess of triphenylphosphine in refluxing ethanol. Triphenylphosphine serves as both a ligand and a two-electron reducing agent that oxidizes itself from oxidation state (III) to (V). In the synthesis, three equivalents of triphenylphosphine become ligands in the product, while the fourth reduces rhodium(III) to rhodium(I).

RhCl_{3}(H_{2}O)_{3} + 4 PPh_{3} → RhCl(PPh_{3})_{3} + OPPh_{3} + 2 HCl + 2 H_{2}O

== Catalytic applications ==
Wilkinson's catalyst is best known for catalyzing the hydrogenation of alkenes with molecular hydrogen. The mechanism of this reaction involves the initial dissociation of one or two triphenylphosphine ligands to give 14- or 12-electron complexes, respectively, followed by oxidative addition of H_{2} to the metal. Subsequent π-complexation of alkene, migratory insertion (intramolecular hydride transfer or olefin insertion), and reductive elimination complete the formation of the alkane product, e.g.:

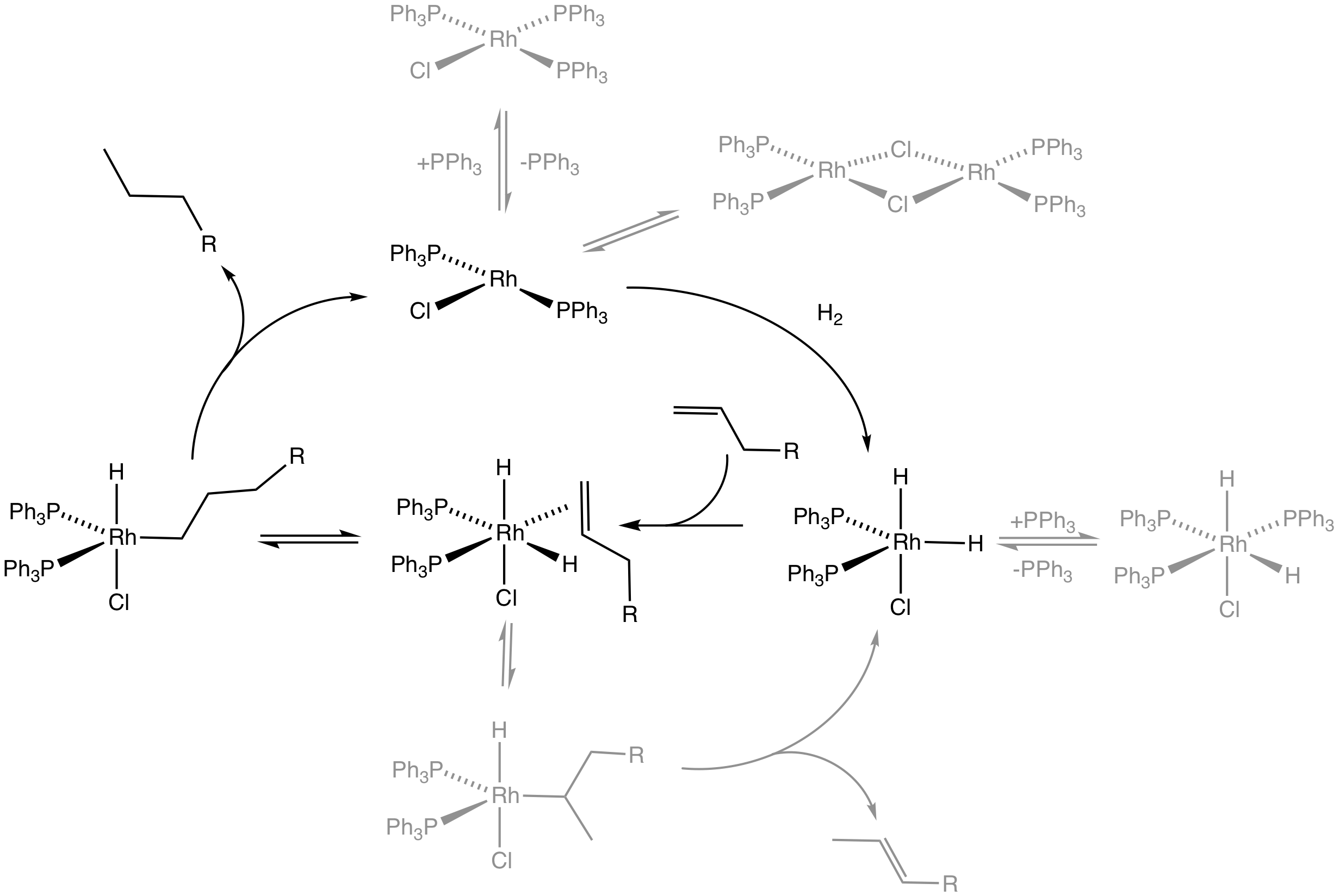

In terms of their rates of hydrogenation, the degree of substitution on the alkene substrate is the key factor, since the rate-limiting step in the mechanism is the insertion into the olefin which is limited by the severe steric hindrance around the metal center. In practice, terminal and disubstituted alkenes are good substrates, but more hindered alkenes are slower to hydrogenate. The hydrogenation of alkynes is troublesome to control since alkynes tend to be reduced to alkanes, via intermediacy of the cis-alkene. Ethylene reacts with Wilkinson's catalyst to give RhCl(C_{2}H_{4})(PPh_{3})_{2}, but it is not a substrate for hydrogenation.

=== Related catalytic processes ===
Wilkinson's catalyst also catalyzes many other hydrofunctionalization reactions including hydroacylation, hydroboration, and hydrosilylation of alkenes. Hydroborations have been studied with catecholborane and pinacolborane. It is also active for the hydrosilylation of alkenes.

In the presence of strong base and hydrogen, Wilkinson's catalyst forms reactive Rh(I) species with superior catalytic activities on the hydrogenation of internal alkynes and functionalized tri-substituted alkenes.

== Reactions ==
RhCl(PPh_{3})_{3} reacts with carbon monoxide to give bis(triphenylphosphine)rhodium carbonyl chloride, trans-RhCl(CO)(PPh_{3})_{2}. The same complex arises from the decarbonylation of aldehydes:

RhCl(PPh_{3})_{3} + RCHO → RhCl(CO)(PPh_{3})_{2} + RH + PPh_{3}

Upon stirring in benzene solution, RhCl(PPh_{3})_{3} converts to the poorly soluble red-colored dimer [RhCl(PPh_{3})_{2}]_{2}. This conversion further demonstrates the lability of the triphenylphosphine ligands.

In the presence of base, H_{2}, and additional triphenylphosphine, Wilkinson's complex converts to hydridotetrakis(triphenylphosphine)rhodium(I), HRh(PPh_{3})_{4}. This 18e complex is also an active hydrogenation catalyst.

== See also ==
- Rhodium-catalyzed hydrogenation
