= (Triphenylphosphine)iron tetracarbonyl =

Identifiers
CAS Number	35679-07-3
3D model (JSmol)	Interactive image
ChemSpider	4807513
PubChem CID	518983
- InChI: InChI=1S/C18H15P.4CO.Fe/c1-4-10-16(11-5-1)19(17-12-6-2-7-13-17)18-14-8-3-9-15-18;4*1-2;/h1-15H;;;;; Key: GHXDZMLBRWBQAM-UHFFFAOYSA-N
- SMILES: [C-]#[O+].[C-]#[O+].[C-]#[O+].[C-]#[O+].C1=CC=C(C=C1)P(C2=CC=CC=C2)C3=CC=CC=C3.[Fe]

Properties
Chemical formula	C_{22}H_{15}FeO_{4}P
Molar mass	430.177 g·mol^{−1}
Appearance	white solid
Melting point	262–266 °C (504–511 °F; 535–539 K)
- Except where otherwise noted, data are given for materials in their standard state (at 25 °C [77 °F], 100 kPa). Infobox references

(Triphenylphosphine)iron tetracarbonyl is a coordination complex with the formula Fe(CO)_{4}(PPh_{3}) (Ph = C_{6}H_{5}). An off-white solid, this complex is derived from iron pentacarbonyl by replacement of one carbonyl ligand by triphenylphosphine (PPh_{3}).

== Synthesis and use ==
The title complex can be prepared by reaction of iron pentacarbonyl or triiron dodecacarbonyl with triphenylphosphine:

Fe_{3}(CO)_{12} + 3 P(C_{6}H_{5})_{3} → 3 Fe(CO)_{4}(P(C_{6}H_{5})_{3})

The substitution is catalyzed by cobalt chloride.

(Triphenylphosphine)iron tetracarbonyl is an intermediate in the synthesis of bis(triphenylphosphine)iron tricarbonyl. Both the mono- and bis(triphenylphosphine) complexes were originally employed in pioneering research on homogeneous catalysis by Walter Reppe.
