= SPANphos =

Names
- Preferred IUPAC name (4,4,4′,4′,6,6′-Hexamethyl-3,3′,4,4′-tetrahydro-2,2′-spirobi[[1]benzopyran]-8,8′-diyl)bis(diphenylphosphane)

Identifiers
| CAS Number | 556797-94-5 |
| 3D model (JSmol) | Interactive image |
| ChemSpider | 57592633 |
| EC Number | 814-334-7 |
| PubChem CID | 12103420 |
| CompTox Dashboard (EPA) | DTXSID501336643 |
- InChI: InChI=1S/C47H46O2P2/c1-33-27-39-43(41(29-33)50(35-19-11-7-12-20-35)36-21-13-8-14-22-36)48-47(31-45(39,3)4)32-46(5,6)40-28-34(2)30-42(44(40)49-47)51(37-23-15-9-16-24-37)38-25-17-10-18-26-38/h7-30H,31-32H2,1-6H3 Key: RQMTZMWXNZQOPD-UHFFFAOYSA-N
- SMILES: CC1=CC(=C2C(=C1)C(CC3(O2)CC(C4=CC(=CC(=C4O3)P(C5=CC=CC=C5)C6=CC=CC=C6)C)(C)C)(C)C)P(C7=CC=CC=C7)C8=CC=CC=C8

Properties
| Chemical formula | C_{47}H_{46}O_{2}P_{2} |
| Molar mass | 704.814 g/mol |
- Except where otherwise noted, data are given for materials in their standard state (at 25 °C [77 °F], 100 kPa). verify (what is ?) Infobox references

SPANphos is an organophosphorus compound used as a ligand in organometallic and coordination chemistry. The compound is a rare example of a trans-spanning ligand and rigidly links mutually trans coordination sites. By virtue of its C_{2}-symmetric backbone, SPANphos forms a chiral cavity over the face of a square planar complexes, e.g. in MCl_{2}(SPANphos) (M = Pd, Pt).

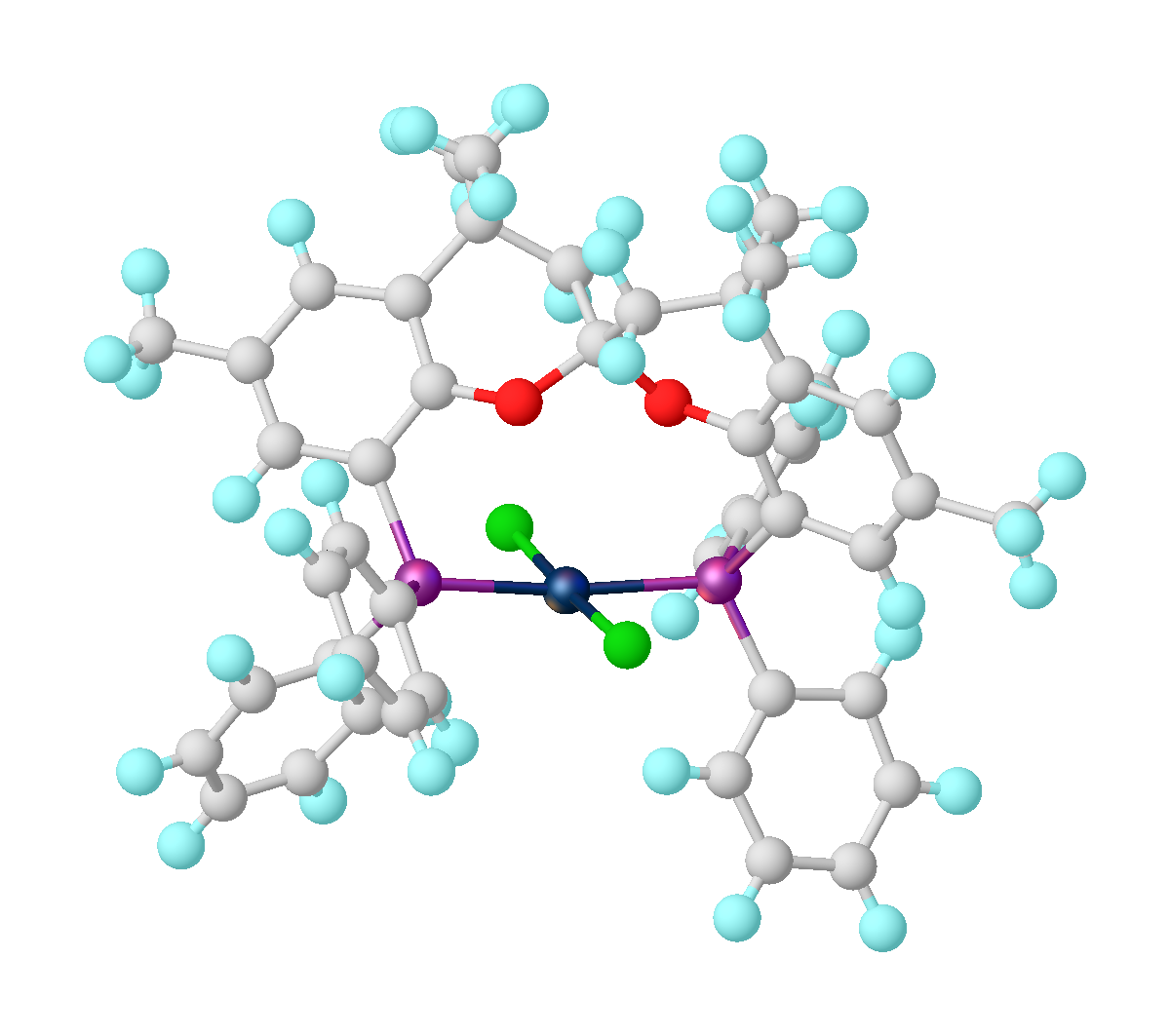
Structure of PtCl_{2}(SPANphos)

== Synthesis ==
SPANphos can be prepared synthesized from relatively inexpensive reagents. In the first step 4,4,4',4',6,6'-hexamethyl-2,2'-spirobichromane is prepared via an acid-catalyzed reaction of p-cresol and acetone. The resultant spirocycle is halogenated with N-bromosuccinimide followed by lithium-bromide exchange using n-BuLi. Treatment of the resulting dilithio compound with chlorodiphenylphosphine completes the synthesis.

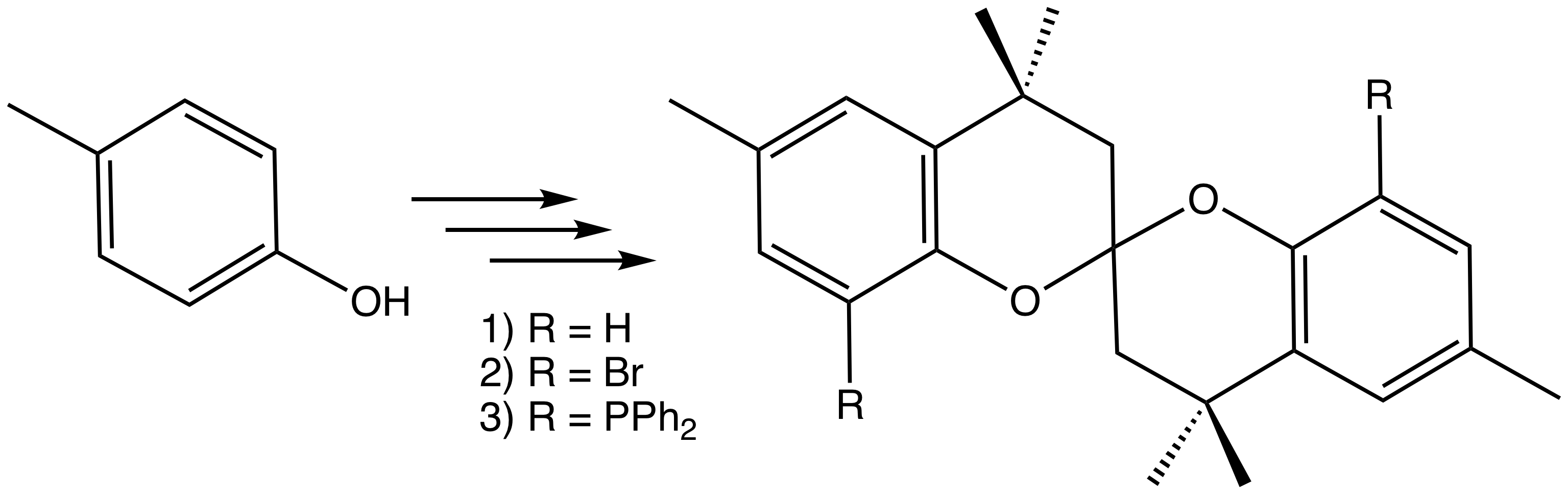
Preparation of SPANphos from p-cresol
