= Hydroformylation =

Chemical process for converting alkenes to aldehydes

Reaction type	Addition reaction

Identifiers
RSC ontology ID	RXNO:0000272

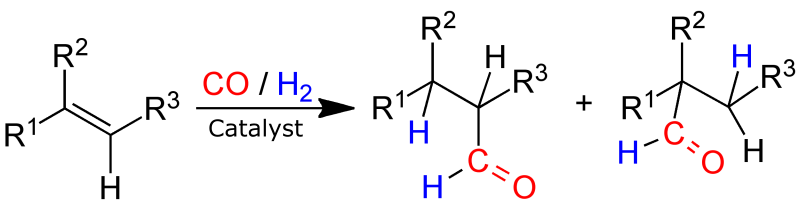
Hydroformylation of an alkene (R^{1} to R^{3} organyl groups (i. e. alkyl- or aryl group) or hydrogen)

In organic chemistry, hydroformylation, also known as oxo synthesis or oxo process, is an industrial process for the production of aldehydes (R−CH=O) from alkenes (R_{2}C=CR_{2}). This chemical reaction entails the net addition of a formyl group (−CHO) and a hydrogen atom to a carbon-carbon double bond. This process has undergone continuous growth since its invention: production capacity reached 6.6×10^{6} tons in 1995. It is important because aldehydes are easily converted into many secondary products. For example, the resultant aldehydes are hydrogenated to alcohols that are converted to detergents. Hydroformylation is also used in speciality chemicals, relevant to the organic synthesis of fragrances and pharmaceuticals. The development of hydroformylation is one of the premier achievements of 20th-century industrial chemistry.

The process entails treatment of an alkene typically with high pressures (between 10 and 100 atmospheres) of carbon monoxide and hydrogen at temperatures between 40 and 200 °C. In one variation, formaldehyde is used in place of synthesis gas. Transition metal catalysts are required. Invariably, the catalyst dissolves in the reaction medium, i.e. hydroformylation is an example of homogeneous catalysis.

== History ==
The process was discovered by the German chemist Otto Roelen in 1938 in the course of investigations of the Fischer–Tropsch process. Aldehydes and diethylketone were obtained when ethylene was added to an F-T reactor. Through these studies, Roelen discovered the utility of cobalt catalysts. HCo(CO)_{4}, which had been isolated only a few years prior to Roelen's work, was shown to be an excellent catalyst. The term oxo synthesis was coined by the Ruhrchemie patent department, who expected the process to be applicable to the preparation of both aldehydes and ketones. Subsequent work demonstrated that the ligand tributylphosphine (PBu_{3}) improved the selectivity of the cobalt-catalysed process. The mechanism of Co-catalyzed hydroformylation was elucidated by Richard F. Heck and David Breslow in the 1960s.

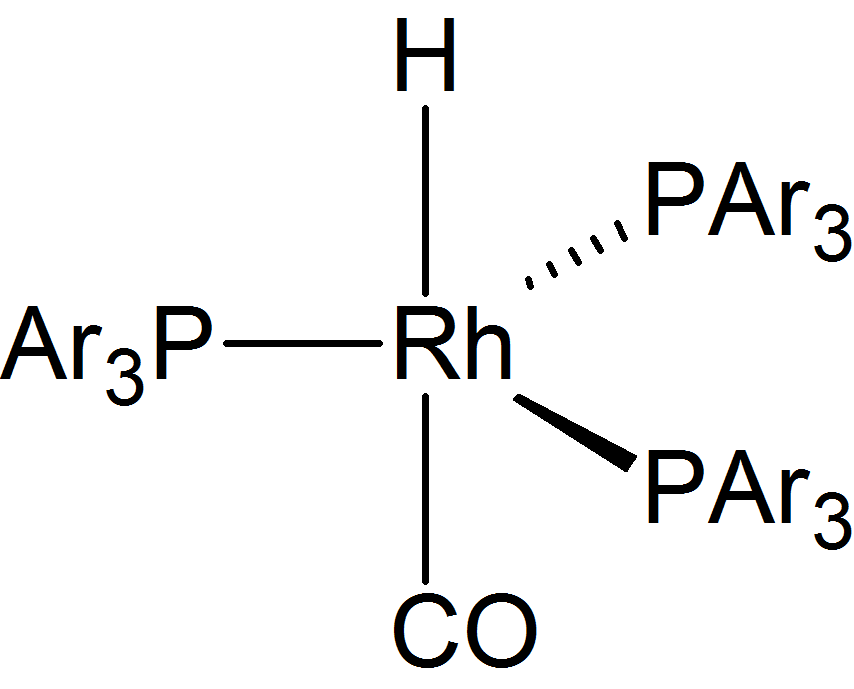
A generic rhodium catalyst, where PAr_{3} = triphenylphosphine or its sulfonated analogue Tppts. See tris(triphenylphosphine)rhodium carbonyl hydride.

In 1968, highly active rhodium-based catalysts were reported. Since the 1970s, most hydroformylation relies on catalysts based on rhodium. Water-soluble catalysts have been developed. They facilitate the separation of the products from the catalyst.

== Mechanism ==
Catalytic cycle using the example of hydroformylation

Mechanism of cobalt-catalyzed hydroformylation. The process begins with dissociation of CO from cobalt tetracarbonyl hydride to give the 16-electron species (step 1). Subsequent binding of alkene gives an 18e species (step 2). In step 3, the olefin inserts to give the 16e alkyl tricarbonyl. Coordination of another equivalent of CO give alkyl tetracarbonyl (step 4). Migratory insertion of CO gives the 16e acyl in step 5. In step 6, oxidative addition of hydrogen gives a dihydrido complex, which in step 7 releases aldehyde by reductive elimination. Step 8 is unproductive and reversible.

=== Selectivity ===
A key consideration of hydroformylation is the "normal" vs. "iso" selectivity. For example, the hydroformylation of propylene can afford two isomeric products, butyraldehyde or isobutyraldehyde:

H_{2} + CO + CH_{3}CH=CH_{2} → CH_{3}CH_{2}CH_{2}CHO (normal)

H_{2} + CO + CH_{3}CH=CH_{2} → (CH_{3})_{2}CHCHO (iso)

These isomers reflect the regiochemistry of the insertion of the alkene into the M–H bond. Since both products are not equally desirable (normal is more stable than iso), much research was dedicated to the quest for catalyst that favored the normal isomer.

=== Steric effects ===
Markovnikov's rule addition of the cobalt hydride to primary alkenes is disfavored by steric hindrance between the cobalt centre and the secondary alkyl ligand. Bulky ligands exacerbate this steric hindrance. Hence, the mixed carbonyl/phosphine complexes offer a greater selectivity for anti-Markovnikov addition, thus favoring straight chain products (n-) aldehydes. Modern catalysts rely increasingly on chelating ligands, especially diphosphites.

n (top) vs. iso (bottom)-selectivity.

=== Electronic effects ===
Additionally, electron-rich the hydride complex are less proton-like. Thus, as a result, the electronic effects that normally favour the Markovnikov addition to an alkene are less applicable. Thus, electron-rich hydrides are more selective.

=== Acyl formation ===
To suppress competing isomerization of the alkene, the rate of migratory insertion of the carbonyl into the carbon-metal bond of the alkyl must be relatively fast. The rate of insertion of the carbonyl carbon into the C-M bond is likely to be greater than the rate of beta-hydride elimination.

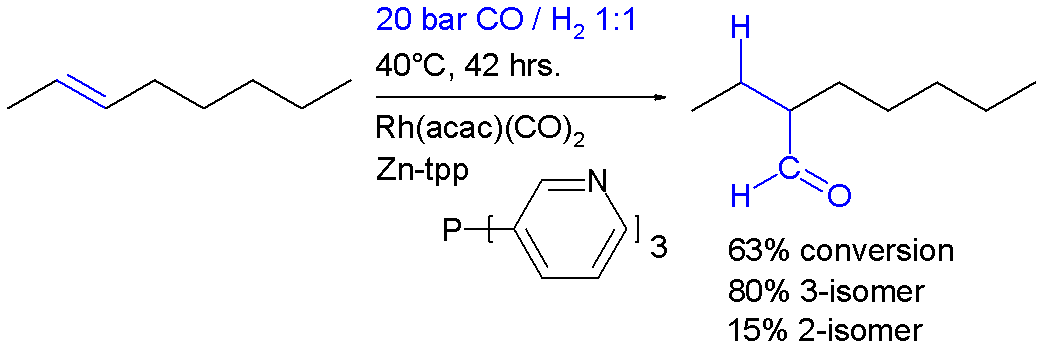
Hydroformylation of oct-2-ene

== Asymmetric hydroformylation ==
Hydroformylation of prochiral alkenes creates new stereocenters. Using chiral phosphine ligands, the hydroformylation can be tailored to favor one enantiomer. Thus, for example, dexibuprofen, the (+)−(S)-enantiomer of ibuprofen, can be produced by enantioselective hydroformylation followed by oxidation.

== Processes ==
The industrial processes vary depending on the chain length of the olefin to be hydroformylated, the catalyst metal and ligands, and the recovery of the catalyst. The original Ruhrchemie process produced propanal from ethylene and syngas using cobalt tetracarbonyl hydride as the catalyst. Today, industrial processes based on cobalt catalysts are mainly used for the production of medium- to long-chain olefins, whereas the rhodium-based catalysts are usually used for the hydroformylation of propene. The rhodium catalysts are significantly more expensive than cobalt catalysts. In the hydroformylation of higher molecular weight olefins the separation of the catalyst from the produced aldehydes is difficult.

=== BASF-oxo process ===
The BASF-oxo process starts mostly with higher olefins and relies on cobalt carbonyl-based catalyst. By conducting the reaction at low temperatures, one observes increased selectivity favoring the linear product. The process is carried out at a pressure of about 30 MPa and in a temperature range of 150 to 170 °C. The cobalt is recovered from the liquid product by oxidation to water-soluble Co^{2 +}, followed by the addition of aqueous formic or acetic acids. This process gives an aqueous phase of cobalt, which can then be recycled. Losses are compensated by the addition of cobalt salts.

=== Exxon process ===
The Exxon process, also Kuhlmann- or PCUK – oxo process, is used for the hydroformylation of C6–C12 olefins. The process relies on cobalt catalysts. In order to recover the catalyst, an aqueous sodium hydroxide solution or sodium carbonate is added to the organic phase. By extraction with olefin and neutralization by addition of sulfuric acid solution under carbon monoxide pressure the metal carbonyl hydride can recovered. This is stripped out with syngas, absorbed by the olefin, and returned to the reactor. Similar to the BASF process, the Exxon process is carried out at a pressure of about 30 MPa and at a temperature of about 160 to 180 °C.

=== Shell process ===
The Shell process uses cobalt complexes modified with phosphine ligands for the hydroformylation of C7–C14 olefins. The resulting aldehydes are directly hydrogenated to the fatty alcohols, which are separated by distillation, which allows the catalyst to be recycled. The process has good selectivity to linear products, which find use as feedstock for detergents. The process is carried out at a pressure of about 4 to 8 MPa and at a temperature range of about 150–190 °C.

=== Union Carbide process ===
The Union Carbide (UCC) process, also known as low-pressure oxo process (LPO), relies on a rhodium catalyst dissolved in high-boiling thick oil, a higher molecular weight condensation product of the primary aldehydes, for the hydroformylation of propene. The reaction mixture is separated in a falling film evaporator from volatile components. The liquid phase is distilled and butyraldehyde is removed as head product while the catalyst containing bottom product is recycled to the process. The process is carried out at about 1.8 MPa and 95–100 °C.

BiPhePhos is representative diphosphite ligand popularized by workers at Union Carbide.

=== Ruhrchemie/Rhone–Poulenc process ===
Process scheme of the Ruhrchemie/Rhône–Poulenc process

The Ruhrchemie/Rhone–Poulenc process (RCRPP) relies on a rhodium catalyst with water-soluble TPPTS as ligand (Kuntz Cornils catalyst) for the hydroformylation of propene. The tri-sulfonation of triphenylphosphane ligand provides hydrophilic properties to the organometallic complex. The catalyst complex carries nine sulfonate-groups and is highly soluble in water (about 1 kg L^{−1}), but not in the emerging product phase. The water-soluble TPPTS is used in about 50-fold excess, whereby the leaching of the catalyst is effectively suppressed. Reactants are propene and syngas consisting of hydrogen and carbon monoxide in a ratio of 1.1:1. A mixture of butyraldehyde and isobutyraldehyde in the ratio 96:4 is generated with few by-products such as alcohols, esters and higher boiling fractions. The Ruhrchemie/Rhone-Poulenc-process is the first commercially available two-phase system in which the catalyst is present in the aqueous phase. In the progress of the reaction an organic product phase is formed which is separated continuously by means of phase separation, wherein the aqueous catalyst phase remains in the reactor.

The process is carried out in a stirred tank reactor where the olefin and the syngas are entrained from the bottom of the reactor through the catalyst phase under intensive stirring. The resulting crude aldehyde phase is separated at the top from the aqueous phase. The aqueous catalyst-containing solution is re-heated via a heat exchanger and pumped back into the reactor. The excess olefin and syngas is separated from the aldehyde phase in a stripper and fed back to the reactor. The generated heat is used for the generation of process steam, which is used for subsequent distillation of the organic phase to separate into butyraldehyde and isobutyraldehyde. Potential catalyst poisons coming from the synthesis gas migrate into the organic phase and removed from the reaction with the aldehyde. Thus, poisons do not accumulate, and the elaborate fine purification of the syngas can be omitted.

A plant was built in Oberhausen in 1984, which was debottlenecked in 1988 and again in 1998 up to a production capacity of 500,000 t/a butanal. The conversion rate of propene is 98% and the selectivity to n-butanal is high. During the life time of a catalyst batch in the process less than 1 ppb rhodium is lost.

=== Laboratory process ===
Recipes have been developed for the hydroformylation on a laboratory scale, e.g. of cyclohexene.

== Substrates other than alkenes ==
Cobalt carbonyl and rhodium complexes catalyse the hydroformylation of formaldehyde and ethylene oxide to give hydroxyacetaldehyde and 3-hydroxypropanal, which can then be hydrogenated to ethylene glycol and propane-1,3-diol, respectively. The reactions work best when the solvent is basic (such as pyridine).

In the case of dicobalt octacarbonyl or Co_{2}(CO)_{8} as a catalyst, pentan-3-one can arise from ethylene and CO, in the absence of hydrogen. A proposed intermediate is the ethylene-propionyl species [CH_{3}C(O)Co(CO)_{3}(ethylene)] which undergoes a migratory insertion to form [CH_{3}COCH_{2}CH_{2}Co(CO)_{3}]. The required hydrogen arises from the water shift reaction. For details, see

If the water shift reaction is not operative, the reaction affords a polymer containing alternating carbon monoxide and ethylene units. Such aliphatic polyketones are more conventionally prepared using palladium catalysts.

Functionalized olefins such as allyl alcohol can be hydroformylated. The target product 1,4-butanediol and its isomer is obtained with isomerization free catalysts such as rhodium-triphenylphosphine complexes. The use of the cobalt complex leads by isomerization of the double bond to n-propanal. The hydroformylation of alkenyl ethers and alkenyl esters occurs usually in the α-position to the ether or ester function.

The hydroformylation of acrylic acid and methacrylic acid in the rhodium-catalyzed process leads to the Markovnikov product in the first step. By variation of the reaction conditions the reaction can be directed to different products. A high reaction temperature and low carbon monoxide pressure favors the isomerization of the Markovnikov product to the thermodynamically more stable β-isomer, which leads to the n-aldehyde. Low temperatures and high carbon monoxide pressure and an excess of phosphine, which blocks free coordination sites, can lead to faster hydroformylation in the α-position to the ester group and suppress the isomerization.

== Side- and consecutive reactions ==
=== Tandem carbonylation-water gas shift reactions ===
Side reactions of the alkenes are the isomerization and hydrogenation of the double bond. While the alkanes resulting from hydrogenation of the double bond do not participate further in the reaction, the isomerization of the double bond with subsequent formation of the n-alkyl complexes is a desired reaction. The hydrogenation is usually of minor importance; However, cobalt-phosphine-modified catalysts can have an increased hydrogenation activity, where up to 15% of the alkene is hydrogenated.

=== Tandem hydroformylation-hydrogenation ===
Using tandem catalysis, systems have been developed for the one-pot conversion of akenes to alcohols. The first step is hydroformylation.

=== Ligand degradation ===
Conditions for hydroformylation catalysis can induce degradation of supporting organophosphorus ligands. Triphenylphosphine is subject to hydrogenolysis, releasing benzene and diphenylphosphine. The insertion of carbon monoxide in an intermediate metal-phenyl bond can lead to the formation of benzaldehyde or by subsequent hydrogenation to benzyl alcohol. One of the ligands phenyl-groups can be replaced by propene, and the resulting diphenylpropylphosphine ligand can inhibit the hydroformylation reaction due to its increased basicity.

== Metals ==
Although the original hydroformylation catalysts were based on cobalt, most modern processes rely on rhodium, which is expensive. There has therefore been interest in finding alternative metal catalysts. Examples of alternative metals include iron and ruthenium.

== See also ==
- Koch reaction - related reaction of alkenes and CO to form carboxylic acids
