= Homogeneous catalysis =

Chemical reaction where catalyst and reactants are in the same phase of matter

In chemistry, homogeneous catalysis is catalysis where the catalyst is in same phase as reactants, principally by a soluble catalyst in a solution. In contrast, heterogeneous catalysis describes processes where the catalysts and substrate are in distinct phases, typically solid and gas, respectively. The term is used almost exclusively to describe solutions and implies catalysis by organometallic compounds. Homogeneous catalysis is an established technology that continues to evolve. An illustrative major application is the production of acetic acid. Enzymes are examples of homogeneous catalysts.

== Examples ==
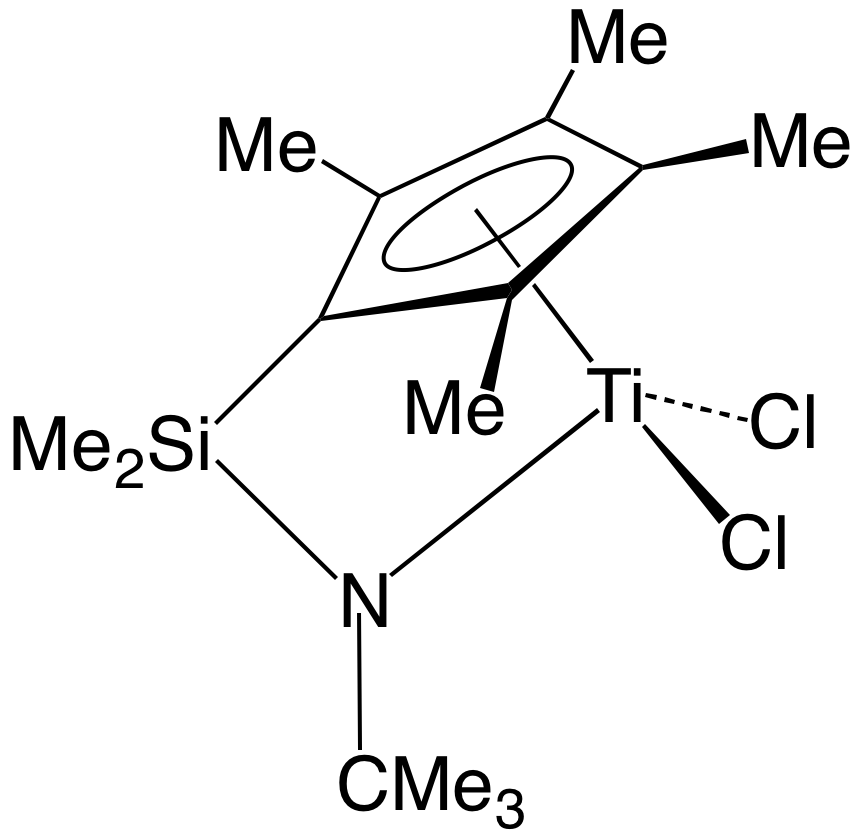
A constrained geometry complex. Such precatalysts are used for the production of polyolefins such as polyethylene and polypropylene.

=== Acid catalyst ===
The proton is a pervasive homogeneous catalyst because water is the most common solvent. Water forms protons by the process of self-ionization of water. In an illustrative case, acids accelerate (catalyze) the hydrolysis of esters:

CH_{3}CO_{2}CH_{3} + H_{2}O ⇌ CH_{3}CO_{2}H + CH_{3}OH

At neutral pH, aqueous solutions of most esters do not hydrolyze at practical rates.

=== Transition metal-catalysis ===
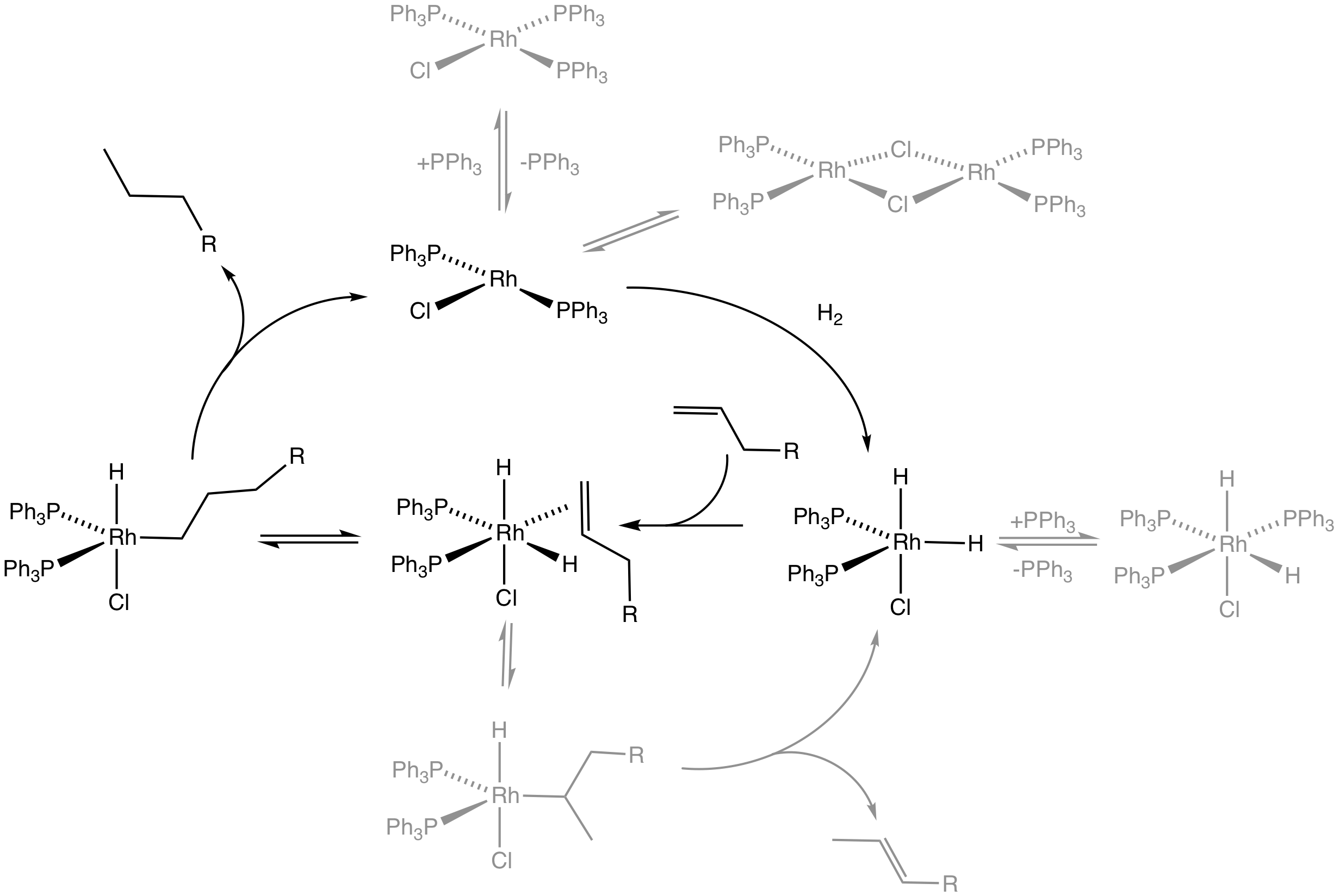
Mechanism for the hydrogenation of an alkene catalyzed by the homogeneous catalyst Wilkinson's catalyst.

==== Hydrogenation and related reactions ====
A prominent class of reductive transformations are hydrogenations. In this process, H_{2}not added to unsaturated substrates. A related methodology, transfer hydrogenation, involves by transfer of hydrogen from one substrate (the hydrogen donor) to another (the hydrogen acceptor). Related reactions entail "HX additions" where X = silyl (hydrosilylation) and CN (hydrocyanation). Most large-scale industrial hydrogenations – margarine, ammonia, benzene-to-cyclohexane – are conducted with heterogeneous catalysts. Fine chemical syntheses, however, often rely on homogeneous catalysts.

==== Carbonylations ====
Hydroformylation, a prominent form of carbonylation, involves the addition of H and "C(O)H" across a double bond. This process is almost exclusively conducted with soluble rhodium- and cobalt-containing complexes.

A related carbonylation is the conversion of alcohols to carboxylic acids. MeOH and CO react in the presence of homogeneous catalysts to give acetic acid, as practiced in the Monsanto process and Cativa processes. Related reactions include hydrocarboxylation and hydroesterifications.

==== Polymerization and metathesis of alkenes ====
A number of polyolefins, e.g. polyethylene and polypropylene, are produced from ethylene and propylene by Ziegler-Natta catalysis. Heterogeneous catalysts dominate, but many soluble catalysts are employed especially for stereospecific polymers. Olefin metathesis is usually catalyzed heterogeneously in industry, but homogeneous variants are valuable in fine chemical synthesis.

==== Oxidations ====
Homogeneous catalysts are also used in a variety of oxidations. In the Wacker process, acetaldehyde is produced from ethene and oxygen. Many non-organometallic complexes are also widely used in catalysis, e.g. for the production of terephthalic acid from xylene. Alkenes are epoxidized and dihydroxylated by metal complexes, as illustrated by the Halcon process and the Sharpless dihydroxylation.

=== Enzymes (including metalloenzymes) ===
Enzymes are homogeneous catalysts that are essential for life but are also harnessed for industrial processes. A well-studied example is carbonic anhydrase, which catalyzes the release of CO_{2} into the lungs from the bloodstream. Enzymes possess properties of both homogeneous and heterogeneous catalysts. As such, they are usually regarded as a third, separate category of catalyst. Water is a common reagent in enzymatic catalysis. Esters and amides are slow to hydrolyze in neutral water, but the rates are sharply affected by metalloenzymes, which can be viewed as large coordination complexes. Acrylamide is prepared by the enzyme-catalyzed hydrolysis of acrylonitrile. US demand for acrylamide was 253,000,000 pounds (115,000,000 kg) as of 2007.

== Advantages and disadvantages ==
=== Advantages ===
- Homogeneous catalysts are often more selective than heterogeneous catalysts.
- For exothermic processes, homogeneous catalysts dump heat into the solvent.
- Homogeneous catalysts are easier to characterize, making their reaction mechanisms amenable to rational manipulation.

=== Disadvantages ===
- The separation of homogeneous catalysts from products can be challenging. In some cases involving high activity catalysts, the catalyst is not removed from the product. In other cases, distillation can extract volatile organic products.
- Homogeneous catalysts have limited thermal stability compared to heterogeneous catalysts. Many organometallic complexes degrade below 100 °C. Some pincer-based catalysts, however, operate near 200 °C.

== See also ==
- Concurrent tandem catalysis
