= Diphosphine ligands =

Class of chemical compounds

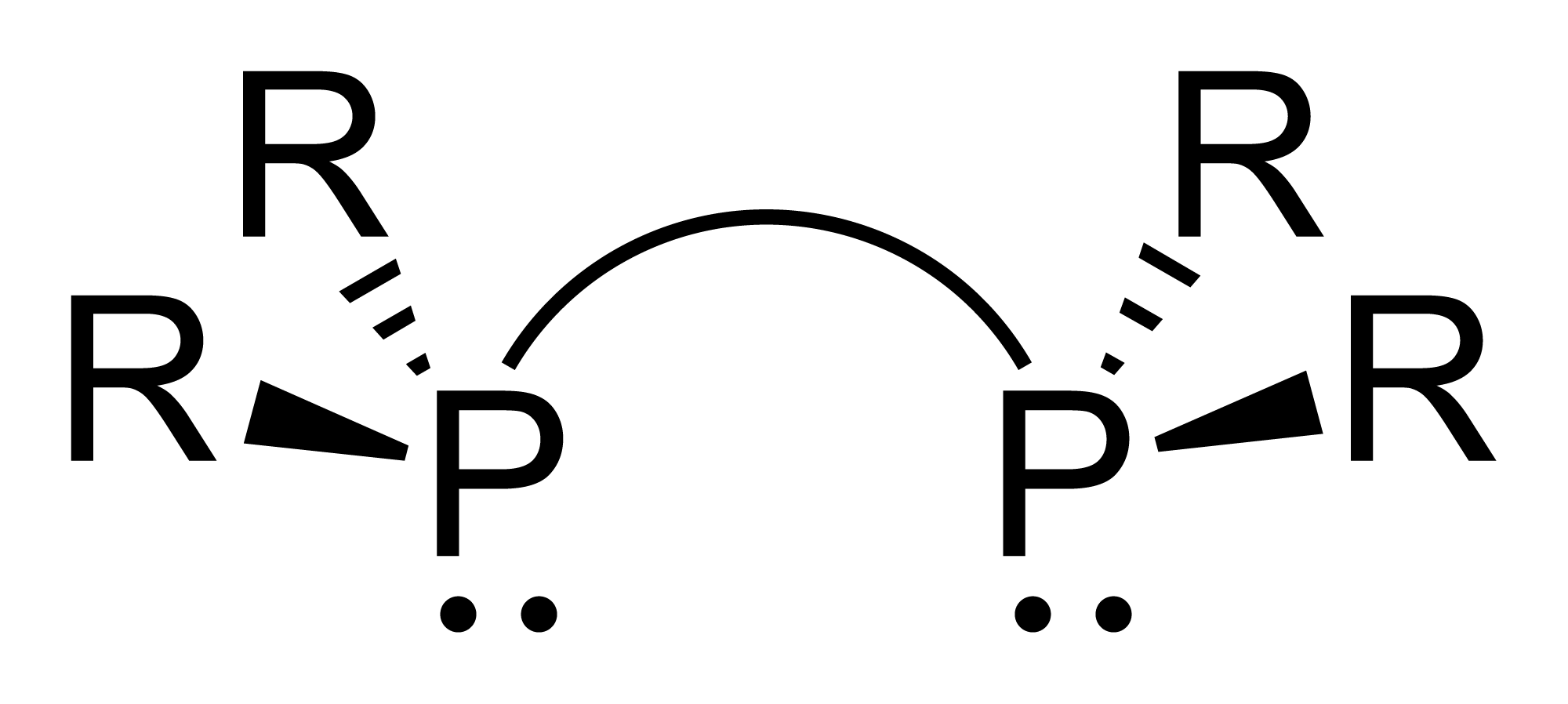
Skeletal formula of a generic diphosphine ligand. R represents a side chain. The phosphine donors are connected by a backbone linker.

Diphosphines, sometimes called bisphosphanes, are organophosphorus compounds most commonly used as bidentate phosphine ligands in inorganic and organometallic chemistry. They are identified by the presence of two phosphino groups linked by a backbone, and are usually chelating. A wide variety of diphosphines have been synthesized with different linkers and R-groups. Alteration of the linker and R-groups alters the electronic and steric properties of the ligands which can result in different coordination geometries and catalytic behavior in homogeneous catalysts.

== Synthesis ==
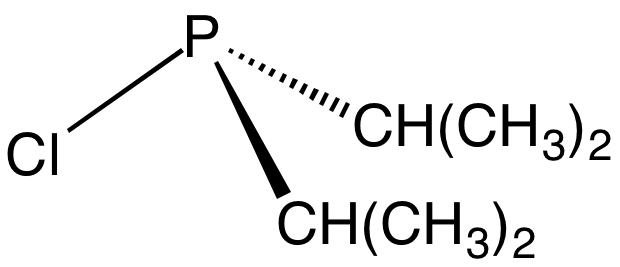
Chlorodiisopropylphosphine is a popular building block for the preparation of diphosphines.

=== From phosphide building blocks ===
(2-Bromophenyl)diphenylphosphine is a precursor to unsymmetrical diphosphines.

Many widely used diphosphine ligands have the general formula Ar_{2}P(CH_{2})_{n}PAr_{2}. These compounds can be prepared from the reaction of X(CH_{2})_{n}X (X=halogen) and MPPh_{2} (M = alkali metal):

Cl(CH_{2})_{n}Cl + 2 NaPPh_{2} → Ph_{2}P(CH_{2})_{n}PPh_{2} + 2 NaCl

Diphosphine ligands can also be prepared from dilithiated reagents and chlorophosphines:

XLi_{2} + 2 ClPAr_{2} → X(PAr_{2})_{2} + 2 LiCl (X = hydrocarbon backbone)

This approach is suitable for installing two dialkylphosphino groups, using reagents such as chlorodiisopropylphosphine.

Another popular method, suitable for preparing unsymmetrical diphosphines, involves the addition of secondary phosphines to vinylphosphines:

Ph_{2}PH + 2 CH_{2}=CHPAr_{2} → Ph_{2}PCH_{2}-CH_{2}PAr_{2}

(2-Lithiophenyl)diphenylphosphine can be used also to give unsymmetrical diphosphines. The lithiated reagent is available from (2-bromophenyl)diphenylphosphine:

Ph_{2}P(C_{6}H_{4}Br) + BuLi → Ph_{2}P(C_{6}H_{4}Li) + BuBr
Ph_{2}P(C_{6}H_{4}Li) + R_{2}PCli → Ph_{2}P(C_{6}H_{4}PR_{2}) + LiCl

=== From bis(dichlorophosphine) precursors ===
Many diphosphines are prepared from compounds of the type X(PCl_{2})_{2} where X = (CH_{2})_{n} or C_{6}H_{4}. The key reagents are 1,2-bis(dichlorophosphino)ethane and 1,2-bis(dichlorophosphino)benzene.

1,2-Bis(dichlorophosphino)ethane is a key intermediate in the synthesis of 1,2-bis(dimethylphosphino)ethane.

== Chain length and coordinating properties ==
The short-chain diphosphine dppm tends to promote metal-metal interactions as illustrated by A-frame complexes. When the two phosphine substituents are linked by two to four carbon centres, the resulting ligands often chelate rings with a single metal. A common diphosphine ligand is dppe, which forms a five-membered chelate ring with most metals.

Some diphosphines, such as the extraordinary case of ^{t}Bu_{2}P(CH_{2})_{10}P^{t}Bu_{2}, give macrocyclic complexes with as many as 72 atoms in a ring.

To position phosphine donor groups trans on a coordination sphere, several atoms are required to link the donor centres and long-chain diphosphines are typically floppy and do not chelate well. This challenge has been resolved by the long but rigid diphosphine SPANphos. The bite angle of the diphosphine influences the reactivity of the metal center.

Some examples of non-chelating diphosphine also exist. Due to steric effect, these phosphorus atoms can not react with anything except a proton. It can be changed from non-chelating to chelating diphosphine by tuning the length of the linking arm.

== Representative ligands ==
Particularly common diphosphine ligands are shown in the table below:

Abbreviation	Common name (from which abbreviation derived)	Structure	Bite angle
dppm	1,1-Bis(diphenylphosphino)methane	Dppm-2D-skeletal	73
dmpe	1,2-Bis(dimethylphosphino)ethane	Dmpe-2D-skeletal-B	
dippe	1,2-Bis(diisopropylphosphino)ethane	1,2-Bis(diisopropylphosphino)ethane-2D-by-AHRLS-2012	
dppbz	1,2-Bis(diphenylphosphino)benzene		
dppe	1,2-Bis(diphenylphosphino)ethane	DPPE structure	86
DIPAMP	derivative of phenylanisylmethylphosphine		
dcpe	Bis(dicyclohexylphosphino)ethane		
dppp	1,3-Bis(diphenylphosphino)propane		91
dppb	1,4-Bis(diphenylphosphino)butane	The diphoshine ligand diphenylphosphinobutane AKA dppb	94
DIOP	(S,S)-DIOP (O-isopropylidene-2,3-dihydroxy-1,4-bis(diphenylphosphino)butane)		
Chiraphos	2,3-Bis(diphenylphosphino)butane	Chiraphos	
BINAP	2,2'-Bis(diphenylphosphino)-1,1'-binaphthyl		93
Xantphos	4,5-Bis(diphenylphosphino)-9,9-dimethylxanthene		108
DPEphos	Bis[(2-diphenylphosphino)phenyl] ether	DPEphos	104
SPANphos	4,4,4',4',6,6'-Hexamethyl-2,2'-spirobichromane-8,8'-diylbis(diphenylphosphane)		
SEGPHOS	4,4'-Bi-1,3-benzodioxole-5,5'-diylbis(diphenylphosphane)		
dppf	1,1'-Bis(diphenylphosphino)ferrocene		99
Me-DuPhos	1,2-Bis(2,5-dimethylphospholano)benzene	DuPhos ligands	
Josiphos	(Diphenylphosphino)ferrocenyl-ethyldicyclohexylphosphine1,5-Diaza-3,7-diphosphacyclooctanes	General Josiphos ligand[3]	
P2N2	1,5-Diaza-3,7-diphosphacyclooctanes		

== See also ==
Dialkylbiaryl phosphine ligands
