= C28H28P2 =

The molecular formula C_{28}H_{28}P_{2} (molar mass: 426.47 g/mol, exact mass: 426.1666 u) may refer to:

- 1,4-Bis(diphenylphosphino)butane (dppb)
- Chiraphos
