= 1,4-Bis(diphenylphosphino)butane =

Chemical compound

Names
- Preferred IUPAC name (Butane-1,4-diyl)bis(diphenylphosphane)
- Other names dppb, dpb

Identifiers
CAS Number	7688-25-7
3D model (JSmol)	Interactive image
ChEMBL	ChEMBL71648
ChemSpider	74118
ECHA InfoCard	100.028.817
EC Number	231-698-7
PubChem CID	82124
UNII	35HP6LTD2D
CompTox Dashboard (EPA)	DTXSID4064769
- InChI: InChI=1S/C28H28P2/c1-5-15-25(16-6-1)29(26-17-7-2-8-18-26)23-13-14-24-30(27-19-9-3-10-20-27)28-21-11-4-12-22-28/h1-12,15-22H,13-14,23-24H2 Key: BCJVBDBJSMFBRW-UHFFFAOYSA-N
- SMILES: C1=CC=C(C=C1)P(CCCCP(C2=CC=CC=C2)C3=CC=CC=C3)C4=CC=CC=C4

Properties
Chemical formula	C_{28}H_{28}P_{2}
Molar mass	426.480 g·mol^{−1}
Melting point	132–136 °C (270–277 °F; 405–409 K)

Hazards
- GHS labelling
Pictograms	(GHS07: Exclamation mark)
Signal word	Warning
Hazard statements	H302, H315, H319, H335
Precautionary statements	P261, P264, P270, P271, P272, P273, P280, P301+P312, P302+P352, P304+P340, P305+P351+P338, P312, P321, P330, P332+P313, P333+P313, P337+P313, P362, P363, P391, P403+P233, P405, P501
- Except where otherwise noted, data are given for materials in their standard state (at 25 °C [77 °F], 100 kPa). Infobox references

1,4-Bis(diphenylphosphino)butane (dppb) is an organophosphorus compound with the formula (Ph_{2}PCH_{2}CH_{2})_{2}. It is less commonly used in coordination chemistry than other diphosphine ligands such as dppe. It is a white solid that is soluble in organic solvents.

== Coordination complexes ==
Nickel complexes in which the ligand is bidentate or monodentate are known. Palladium complexes containing dppb are used in a variety of catalytic reactions. The ligand's natural bite angle is 94° in its bidentate coordination mode.

== Related compounds ==
- 1,2-Bis(dimethylphosphino)ethane
- Bis(diphenylphosphino)methane
- 1,3-Bis(diphenylphosphino)propane
