= Hydroacylation =

Organic reaction

Hydroacylation is a type of organic reaction in which an electron-rich unsaturated hydrocarbon inserts into a formyl C-H bond. With alkenes, the product is a ketone:

RCHO + CH_{2}=CHR' → RC(O)CH_{2}CH_{2}R'

With an alkyne instead, the reaction produces an α,β-unsaturated ketone.

The reaction requires a metal catalyst or a radical initiator. Even so, the reaction is difficult to engineer, as oxidizing aldehydes to acyl radicals occurs only at high electrochemical potential. It is almost invariably practiced as an intramolecular reaction using homogeneous catalysts, often based on rhodium phosphines.

== History ==
Hydroacylation first appeared in 1949, part of Kharasch's studies on peroxide effects. Because chain transfer occurs very slowly, the radical reaction required a very large excess of aldehyde and, with dicarbonyl substrates, decarbonylation byproducts appeared in large quantity.

In the 1970s, metal-catalyzed hydroacylation was discovered for the synthesis of certain prostanoids. The reaction required tin tetrachloride and a stoichiometric amount of Wilkinson's catalyst:

An equal amount of a cyclopropane was formed as the result of decarbonylation.

The first catalytic application involved cyclization of 4-pentenal to cyclopentanone using (again) Wilkinson's catalyst. In this reaction the solvent was saturated with ethylene.

CH_{2}=CHCH_{2}CH_{2}CHO → (CH_{2})_{4}CO

As of 2019, metal-catalyzed reactions continued to require rhodium catalysis.

In the 1990s, studies on acyl radicals revealed that thiols or N-hydroxyphthalimide could catalyze rapid chain transfer, mostly removing the drawbacks of Kharasch's original radical reaction. However, substrate scope remained limited. Modern work focuses on photoredox catalysis, and has produced mediocre-yielding catalysts that handle arbitrary substrates.

== Reaction mechanism ==
In the presence of a metal catalyst, hydroacylation begins with two oxidative additions: of the alkene and into the aldehydic carbon-hydrogen bond. The relative order of these two coordinations is unclear. The product is an acyl-metal hydride alkene complex. Then the alkene ligand undergoes migratory insertion into either the metal-acyl or the metal-hydride bonds. Finally, the resulting alkyl-acyl or beta-ketoalkyl-hydride complex undergoes reductive elimination.

A competing side-reaction is decarbonylation of the intermediate acyl-metal hydride to give an alkane and a metal carbonyl:

R"C(O)-ML_{n}-H → R"-M(CO)L_{n}-H → R"-H + M(CO)L_{n}

== Asymmetric hydroacylation ==
Hydroacylation as an asymmetric reaction was demonstrated in the form of a kinetic resolution. A true asymmetric synthesis was also described. Both conversions employed rhodium catalysts and a chiral diphosphine ligand. In one application the ligand is Me-DuPhos:
