= A-frame =

Basic load-bearing structure

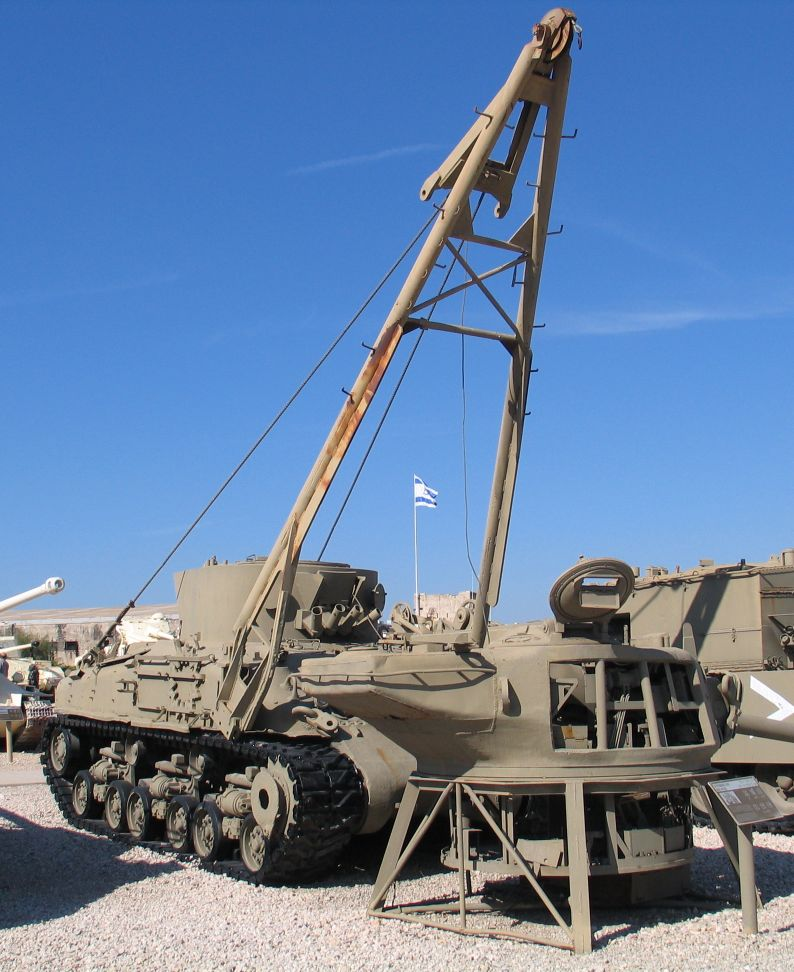
An A-frame used as shears on top of an M32 armored recovery vehicle

A sawhorse can be formed by connecting two A-frames along the length of a beam

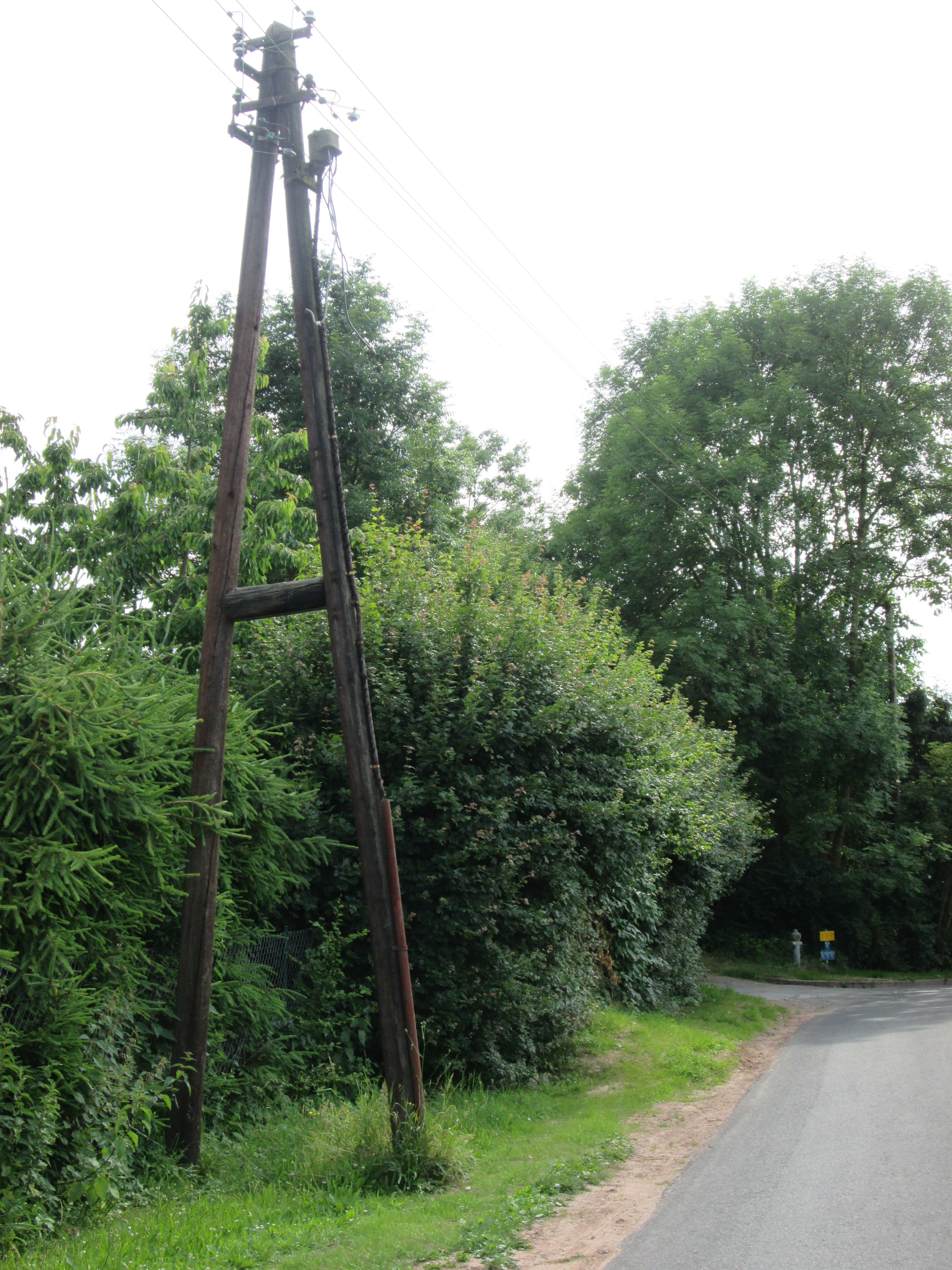
A-frame utility pole in Germany

An A-frame is a basic structure designed to bear a load in a lightweight economical manner. The simplest form of an A-frame is two similarly sized beams, arranged in an angle of 45 degrees or less, attached at the top, like an uppercase letter 'A'. These materials are often wooden or steel beams attached at the top by rope, welding, gluing, or riveting.

A-frames can be used as-is, as part of shears, or set up in a row along a longitudinal beam for added stability, as in a saw horse. More complex structures will often have crossmembers connecting the A-frames at different angles, forming a truss.

== Other structures that use A-frames ==
- A-frame house
- A-frame hydroponics system
- A-frame contour measuring spirit level
- A frame camping tent
- A-frame complex, a motif in chemistry
- Folding ladder
- Double wishbone suspension (cars)
- Some suspension bridges
- Some swing bridges
- A-frame level: An A-frame with a plumb line hung from the vertex, used to establish a horizontal line; known in ancient Egypt, these were used in Europe until the mid–19th century.
- At the stern of ships for fishing or research. These may be fixed or luffing. Similar arrangements are used for launch and recovery systems for diving bells, ROUVs and small submersibles from other positions on a support ship.
- The main building of Florida's Disney's Contemporary Resort, in which the Walt Disney World monorail has a station
- Some Wienerschnitzel and Whataburger restaurants use the A-frame
- The London Eye is supported by only one A-frame on one side.
- Some beam engines use an A-frame
