= 1,2-Bis(diphenylphosphino)ethylene =

- cis isomer

Names
- Preferred IUPAC name [(Z)-Ethene-1,2-diyl]bis(diphenylphosphane)

Identifiers
CAS Number	983-80-2
3D model (JSmol)	Interactive image
ChEMBL	ChEMBL2114057
ChemSpider	2015214
ECHA InfoCard	100.012.336
EC Number	213-569-7
PubChem CID	2733415
CompTox Dashboard (EPA)	DTXSID601283879
- InChI: InChI=1S/C26H22P2/c1-5-13-23(14-6-1)27(24-15-7-2-8-16-24)21-22-28(25-17-9-3-10-18-25)26-19-11-4-12-20-26/h1-22H/b22-21- Key: NCKJIJSEWKIXAT-DQRAZIAOSA-N
- SMILES: C1=CC=C(C=C1)P(/C=C\P(C2=CC=CC=C2)C3=CC=CC=C3)C4=CC=CC=C4

Properties
Chemical formula	C_{26}H_{22}P_{2}
Molar mass	396.410 g·mol^{−1}
Appearance	white solid
Melting point	125 °C (257 °F; 398 K)

Hazards
- GHS labelling
Pictograms	(GHS07: Exclamation mark)
Signal word	Warning
Hazard statements	H315, H319, H335
Precautionary statements	P261, P264, P271, P280, P302+P352, P304+P340, P305+P351+P338, P312, P321, P332+P313, P337+P313, P362, P403+P233, P405, P501
- Except where otherwise noted, data are given for materials in their standard state (at 25 °C [77 °F], 100 kPa). Infobox references

cis-1,2-Bis(diphenylphosphino)ethylene (dppv) is an organophosphorus compound with the formula C_{2}H_{2}(PPh_{2})_{2} (Ph = C_{6}H_{5}). Both the cis and trans isomers are known, but the cis isomer is of primary interest. Classified as a diphosphine ligand, it is a bidentate ligand in coordination chemistry. For example it gives rise to the complex Ni(dppv)_{2} and the coordination polymer [Ni(dppv)]_{n}. As a chelating ligand, dppv is very similar to 1,2-bis(diphenylphosphino)benzene.

The diphosphine is prepared by reaction of lithium diphenylphosphide with cis-dichloroethylene.

2 LiPPh_{2} + C_{2}H_{2}Cl_{2} → C_{2}H_{2}(PPh_{2})_{2} + 2 LiCl

trans-1,2-Bis(diphenylphosphino)ethylene is made similarly, but using trans-dichloroethylene.
