= Spectator ligand =

Ligand that does not participate in chemical reactions

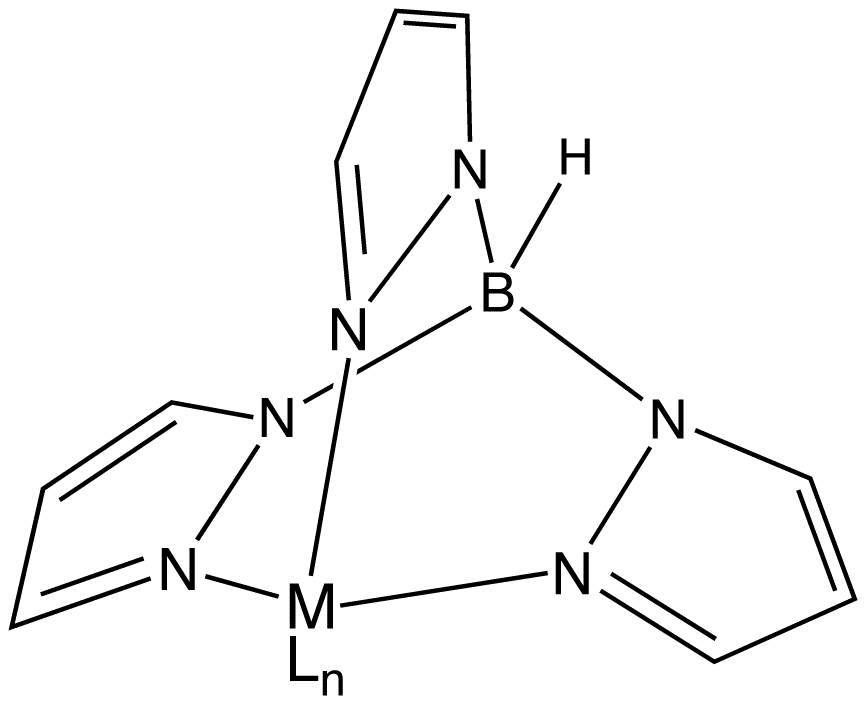
Idealized structure of a Tp ligand bound to a metal center ML_{n}. Tp^{−} is a spectator ligand in this complex.

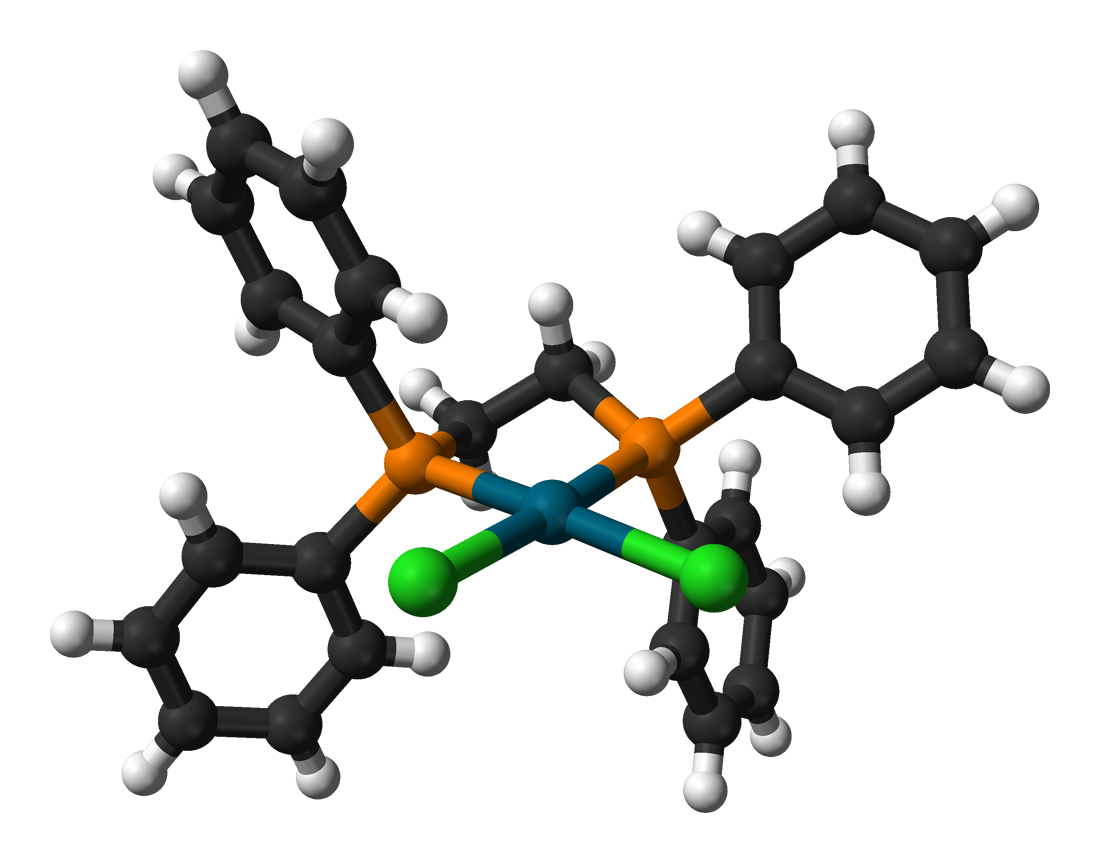
Ball-and-stick model of [PdCl_{2}(dppe)]. Dppe is a spectator ligand in this complex.

In coordination chemistry, a spectator ligand is a ligand that does not participate in chemical reactions of the complex. Instead, spectator ligands (vs "actor ligands") occupy coordination sites. Spectator ligands tend to be of polydentate, such that the M-spectator ensemble is inert kinetically. Although they do not participate in reactions of the metal, spectator ligands influence the reactivity of the metal center to which they are bound. These ligands are sometimes referred to as ancillary ligands.

Several different classes of ligand exist that can be considered spectator ligands. A few examples include trispyrazolylborates (Tp), cyclopentadienyl ligands (Cp), and many chelating diphosphines such as 1,2-bis(diphenylphosphino)ethane ligands (dppe). Varying the substituents on the spectator ligands greatly influences the solubility, stability, electronic, and steric properties of the metal complex. In the area of platinum-based antineoplastic agents, spectator (and nonspectator) ligands greatly affect efficacy.
