= 1,2-Bis(dichlorophosphino)ethane =

Names
- Preferred IUPAC name (Ethane-1,2-diyl)bis(phosphonous dichloride)
- Other names 1,2-Ethanebis(phosphonous dichloride)

Identifiers
CAS Number	28240-69-9
3D model (JSmol)	Interactive image
ChemSpider	107057
ECHA InfoCard	100.156.519
PubChem CID	119904
UNII	AE6TUW97XQ
CompTox Dashboard (EPA)	DTXSID3067368
- InChI: InChI=1S/C2H4Cl4P2/c3-7(4)1-2-8(5)6/h1-2H2 Key: SBWAJHLQMFBNIN-UHFFFAOYSA-N
- SMILES: C(CP(Cl)Cl)P(Cl)Cl

Properties
Chemical formula	C_{2}H_{4}Cl_{4}P_{2}
Molar mass	231.80 g·mol^{−1}
Appearance	colorless liquid
Boiling point	68 °C (154 °F; 341 K) 1 mmHg

Hazards
- GHS labelling
Pictograms	(GHS05: Corrosive)
Signal word	Danger
Hazard statements	H314
Precautionary statements	P260, P264, P280, P301+P330+P331, P303+P361+P353, P304+P340, P305+P351+P338, P310, P321, P363, P405, P501
- Except where otherwise noted, data are given for materials in their standard state (at 25 °C [77 °F], 100 kPa). Infobox references

1,2-Bis(dichlorophosphino)ethane is an organophosphorus compound with the formula (CH_{2}PCl_{2})_{2}. This colorless liquid is a precursor to chelating diphosphines.

== Synthesis and reactions ==
It is prepared by the reaction of ethylene, white phosphorus, and phosphorus trichloride:

3 C_{2}H_{4} + 0.5 P_{4} + 4 PCl_{3} → 3 (CH_{2}PCl_{2})_{2}

The compound reacts with Grignard reagents and secondary amines to give chelating ligands. An often practiced use of this compound is the synthesis of 1,2-bis(dimethylphosphino)ethane.

== Related compounds ==
- 1,2-Bis(dichlorophosphino)benzene
- 1,2-Bis(diisopropylphosphino)ethane
