= 1,2-Bis(dimethylphosphino)ethane =

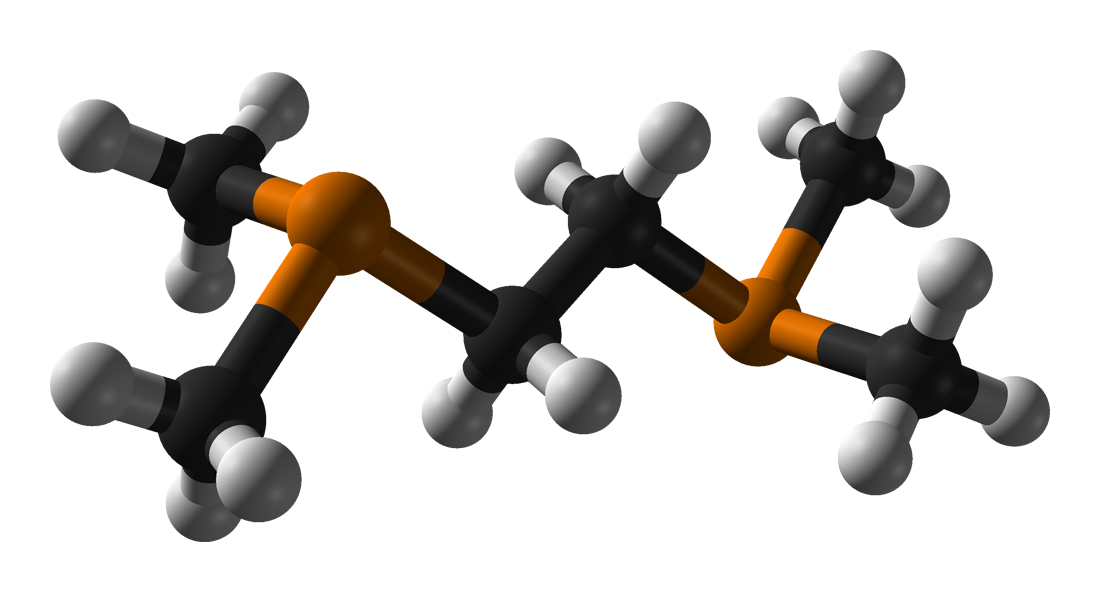

Names
- Preferred IUPAC name (Ethane-1,2-diyl)bis(dimethylphosphane)
- Other names DMPE ethylenebis(dimethylphosphine); 1,2-Bis(dimethylphosphino)ethane

Identifiers
CAS Number	23936-60-9
3D model (JSmol)	Interactive image
ChemSpider	124423
ECHA InfoCard	100.155.809
EC Number	627-450-6
PubChem CID	141059
UNII	9P3522CZ8T
CompTox Dashboard (EPA)	DTXSID70178649
- InChI: InChI=1S/C6H16P2/c1-7(2)5-6-8(3)4/h5-6H2,1-4H3 Key: ZKWQSBFSGZJNFP-UHFFFAOYSA-N; InChI=1/C6H16P2/c1-7(2)5-6-8(3)4/h5-6H2,1-4H3 Key: ZKWQSBFSGZJNFP-UHFFFAOYAN
- SMILES: P(C)(C)CCP(C)C

Properties
Chemical formula	C_{6}H_{16}P_{2}
Molar mass	150.142 g·mol^{−1}
Density	0.9 g/mL at 25 °C
Boiling point	180 °C (356 °F; 453 K)

Hazards
- GHS labelling
Pictograms	(GHS02: Flammable) (GHS07: Exclamation mark)
Signal word	Danger
Hazard statements	H225, H250, H315, H319, H335
Precautionary statements	P210, P222, P231, P233, P240, P241, P242, P243, P261, P264, P264+P265, P271, P280, P302+P335+P334, P302+P352, P303+P361+P353, P304+P340, P305+P351+P338, P319, P321, P332+P317, P337+P317, P362+P364, P370+P378, P403+P233, P403+P235, P405, P501
- Except where otherwise noted, data are given for materials in their standard state (at 25 °C [77 °F], 100 kPa). verify (what is ?) Infobox references

1,2-Bis(dimethylphosphino)ethane (dmpe) is a diphosphine ligand in coordination chemistry. It is a colorless, air-sensitive liquid that is soluble in organic solvents. With the formula (CH_{2}PMe_{2})_{2}, dmpe is used as a compact strongly basic spectator ligand (Me = methyl), Representative complexes include V(dmpe)_{2}(BH_{4})_{2}, Mn(dmpe)_{2}(AlH_{4})_{2}, Tc(dmpe)_{2}(CO)_{2}Cl, and Ni(dmpe)Cl_{2}.

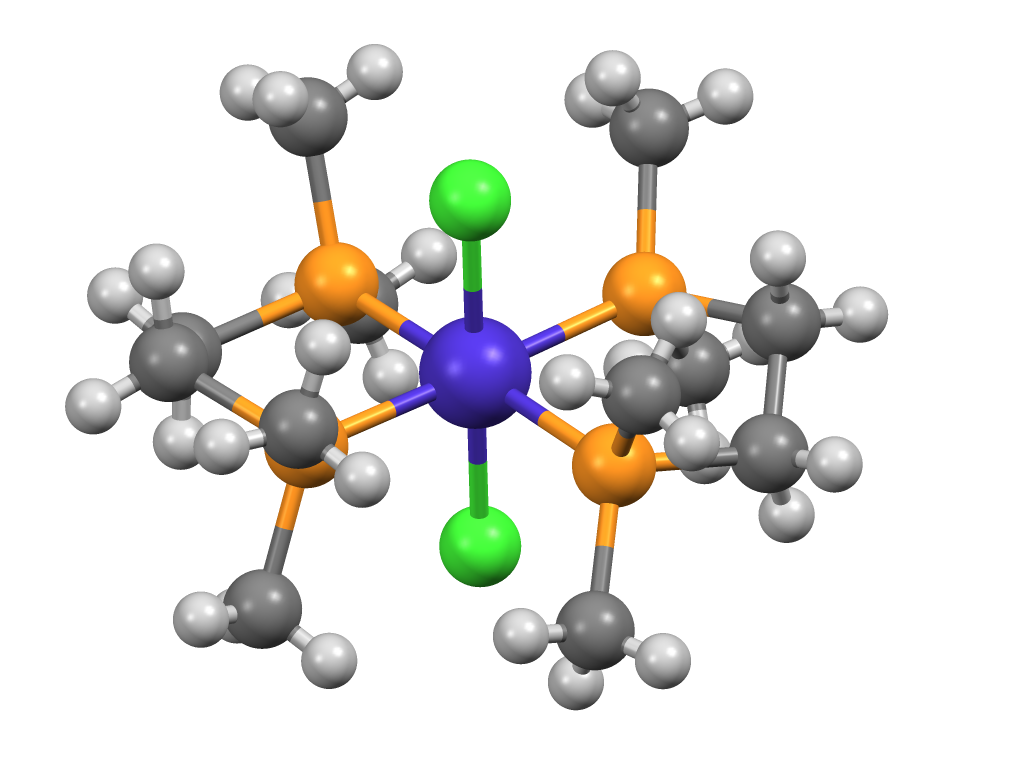
Structure of trans-CoCl_{2}(dmpe)_{2} (P is ochre, Co. is blue, Cl is green).

== Synthesis ==
It is synthesised by the reaction of methylmagnesium iodide with 1,2-bis(dichlorophosphino)ethane:

Cl_{2}PCH_{2}CH_{2}PCl_{2} + 4 MeMgI → Me_{2}PCH_{2}CH_{2}PMe_{2} + 4 MgICl

Alternatively it can be generated by alkylation of sodium dimethylphosphide.

The synthesis of dmpe from thiophosphoryl chloride has led to serious accidents and has been abandoned.

== Related ligands ==
- Bis(dicyclohexylphosphino)ethane, a bulkier analogue, which is also a solid.
- 1,2-Bis(diphenylphosphino)ethane, more air-stable than dmpe, but less basic.
- 1,2-Bis(dimethylphosphino)benzene, a more rigid analogue of dmpe.
- Tetramethylethylenediamine, the diamine analogue of dmpe.
