= Phospholane =

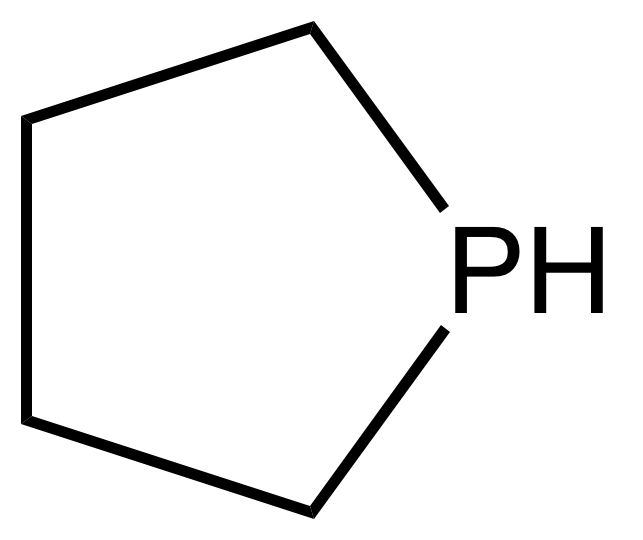

Names
- Preferred IUPAC name Phospholane

Identifiers
CAS Number	3466-00-0
3D model (JSmol)	Interactive image
Beilstein Reference	605298
ChEBI	CHEBI:33133
ChemSpider	69459
ECHA InfoCard	100.020.383
EC Number	222-420-5
Gmelin Reference	323930
PubChem CID	77013
UNII	2BH587UMF9
CompTox Dashboard (EPA)	DTXSID00188216
- InChI: InChI=1S/C4H9P/c1-2-4-5-3-1/h5H,1-4H2 Key: GWLJTAJEHRYMCA-UHFFFAOYSA-N
- SMILES: C1CPCC1

Properties
Chemical formula	C_{4}H_{9}P
Molar mass	88.090 g·mol^{−1}
Appearance	colorless liquid
Boiling point	100–103 °C (212–217 °F; 373–376 K)
- Except where otherwise noted, data are given for materials in their standard state (at 25 °C [77 °F], 100 kPa). Infobox references

Phospholane is the organophosphorus compound with the formula (CH_{2})_{4}PH. This colorless liquid is the parent member of a family of five-membered, saturated rings containing phosphorus. Although phospholane itself is only of minor academic interest, the class of C- and P-substituted phospholanes are valued ligands in asymmetric hydrogenation and related areas of homogeneous catalysis. Phospholane is prepared by reduction of 1-chlorophospholane, which in turn is obtained by the reaction of 1-phenylphospholane and phosphorus trichloride.

DuPhos is one of several phospholane ligands.
