= DuPhos =

Class of chemical compounds

DuPhos ligands

DuPhos is a class of organophosphorus compound that are used as ligands for asymmetric synthesis. The name DuPhos is derived from (1) the chemical company that sponsored the research leading to this ligand's invention, DuPont and (2) the compound is a diphosphine ligand type. Specifically it is classified as a C_{2}-symmetric ligand, consisting of two phospholane rings affixed to a benzene ring.

The ligand was introduced in 1991 by M.J. Burk and first demonstrated in asymmetric hydrogenation of certain enamide esters to amino acid precursors:

Other chiral diphosphine ligands were known at the time of invention, e.g. DIOP, DIPAMP, CHIRAPHOS, but DuPhos was found to be more effective.

== Description ==
The ligand consists of two 2,5-alkyl-substituted phospholane rings connected by a 1,2-phenyl bridge. The alkyl group can be methyl, ethyl, propyl, or isopropyl. In the closely related bis(dimethylphospholano)ethane or BPE ligand the o-phenylene bridge is replaced by a 1,2-ethylene bridge. Both compounds can be obtained from the corresponding chiral diol through conversion to the cyclic sulfate and reaction with lithiated phenylbisphosphine. In DuPhos the phosphorus atoms are electron-rich making the resulting metal complexes reactive. The phosphorus atoms also introduce a kind of pseudo-chirality making enantioselection independent of the overall chemical conformation

Another early application is the synthesis of unnatural chiral amino acids in a formal reductive amination for example starting from benzophenone and the hydrazone of benzoyl chloride:

In the original scope the metal catalyst was rhodium but catalysis by ruthenium was introduced in 1995 with the hydrogenation of the ketone group in β-keto esters:

== Applications ==
An application of an asymmetric synthesis with a DuPhos ligand is the hydrogenation of dehydrowarfarin to warfarin:

Duphos is also applied in the synthesis of tryptophan derivatives.

== In polymerization catalysis ==
DuPhos ligands are used in metal catalyzed alpha-olefin/carbon monoxide copolymerization to form chiral isotactic polyketones. The first publication in this field dates back to 1994 with catalyst system [Pd(Me-DuPhos(MeCN)_{2})](BF4)_{2}

== BozPhos ligand ==
Mono oxidation of (R,R)-Me-Duphos using borane dimethylsulfide as protective group and hydrogen peroxide as oxidizing agent gives bozPhos This ligand is useful in copper-catalyzed asymmetric addition of diorganozinc reagents to N-diphenylphosphinoylimines.
