= DPEphos =

Chemical compound

Names
- Preferred IUPAC name [Oxydi(2,1-phenylene)]bis(diphenylphosphane)
- Other names DPEphos, Bis[(2-diphenylphosphino)phenyl] ether

Identifiers
CAS Number	166330-10-5
3D model (JSmol)	Interactive image
ChemSpider	3492440
ECHA InfoCard	100.203.278
EC Number	678-206-0
PubChem CID	4285986
CompTox Dashboard (EPA)	DTXSID20401575
- InChI: InChI=1S/C36H28OP2/c1-5-17-29(18-6-1)38(30-19-7-2-8-20-30)35-27-15-13-25-33(35)37-34-26-14-16-28-36(34)39(31-21-9-3-10-22-31)32-23-11-4-12-24-32/h1-28H Key: RYXZOQOZERSHHQ-UHFFFAOYSA-N
- SMILES: C1=CC=C(C=C1)P(C2=CC=CC=C2)C3=CC=CC=C3OC4=CC=CC=C4P(C5=CC=CC=C5)C6=CC=CC=C6

Properties
Chemical formula	C_{36}H_{28}OP_{2}
Molar mass	538.567 g·mol^{−1}
Appearance	white powder
Melting point	175–176 °C (347–349 °F; 448–449 K)

Hazards
- GHS labelling
Pictograms	(GHS07: Exclamation mark)
Signal word	Warning
Hazard statements	H302, H315, H319, H335, H413
Precautionary statements	P261, P264, P264+P265, P270, P271, P273, P280, P301+P317, P302+P352, P304+P340, P305+P351+P338, P319, P321, P330, P332+P317, P337+P317, P362+P364, P403+P233, P405, P501
- Except where otherwise noted, data are given for materials in their standard state (at 25 °C [77 °F], 100 kPa). Infobox references

Bis[(2-diphenylphosphino)phenyl] ether, also known as DPEphos, is a wide bite angle diphosphine ligand used in inorganic and organometallic chemistry. The name DPEphos is derived from diphenyl ether (DPE) which makes up the ligand's backbone. It is similar to Xantphos, another diphosphine ligand, but is more flexible and has a smaller bite angle (104 vs 108°). It is synthesized from chlorodiphenylphosphine and DPE.
