= 1,2-Bis(diphenylphosphino)benzene =

Names
- Preferred IUPAC name (1,2-Phenylene)bis(diphenylphosphane)
- Other names o-Phenylenebis[diphenylphosphine, dppben, dppbenz, dppbe, dppBz, dppbz

Identifiers
CAS Number	13991-08-7
3D model (JSmol)	Interactive image
ChemSpider	436234
PubChem CID	498379
CompTox Dashboard (EPA)	DTXSID60333306
- InChI: InChI=1S/C30H24P2/c1-5-15-25(16-6-1)31(26-17-7-2-8-18-26)29-23-13-14-24-30(29)32(27-19-9-3-10-20-27)28-21-11-4-12-22-28/h1-24H Key: NFRYVRNCDXULEX-UHFFFAOYSA-N
- SMILES: C1=CC=C(C=C1)P(C2=CC=CC=C2)C3=CC=CC=C3P(C4=CC=CC=C4)C5=CC=CC=C5

Properties
Chemical formula	C_{30}H_{24}P_{2}
Molar mass	446.470 g·mol^{−1}
Appearance	white solid
Melting point	185–187 °C (365–369 °F; 458–460 K)
- Except where otherwise noted, data are given for materials in their standard state (at 25 °C [77 °F], 100 kPa). Infobox references

1,2-Bis(diphenylphosphino)benzene (dppbz) is an organophosphorus compound with the formula C_{6}H_{4}(PPh_{2})_{2} (Ph = C_{6}H_{5}). Classified as a diphosphine ligand, it is a common bidentate ligand in coordination chemistry. It is a white, air-stable solid. As a chelating ligand, dppbz is very similar to 1,2-bis(diphenylphosphino)ethylene.
