= Bis(diethylamino)chlorophosphine =

Names
- Other names N,N,N',N'-tetraethylphosphorodiamidous chloride

Identifiers
CAS Number	685-83-6
3D model (JSmol)	Interactive image
ChemSpider	2015150
ECHA InfoCard	100.155.896
PubChem CID	3316562
CompTox Dashboard (EPA)	DTXSID10391390
- InChI: InChI=1S/C6H4Cl4P2/c7-11(8)5-3-1-2-4-6(5)12(9)10/h1-4H Key: IGYHSFVSIYJSML-UHFFFAOYSA-N
- SMILES: C1=CC=C(C(=C1)P(Cl)Cl)P(Cl)Cl

Properties
Chemical formula	C_{8}H_{20}Cl_{4}N_{2}P
Molar mass	210,687
Appearance	colorless liquid
Boiling point	87–90 °C (189–194 °F; 360–363 K) 2 torr

Hazards
- GHS labelling
Pictograms	(GHS05: Corrosive)
Signal word	Danger
Hazard statements	H314
Precautionary statements	P260, P264, P280, P301+P330+P331, P303+P361+P353, P304+P340, P305+P351+P338, P310, P321, P363, P405, P501
- Except where otherwise noted, data are given for materials in their standard state (at 25 °C [77 °F], 100 kPa). Infobox references

Bis(diethylamino)chlorophosphine is an organophosphorus compound with the formula (Et_{2}N)_{2}PCl (Et = ethyl). This colorless liquid serves as a masked source of PCl_{2}^{+}.

== Synthesis and reactions ==
The compound is prepared by treatment of phosphorus trichloride with diethylamine:

4 Et_{2}NH + PCl_{3} → (Et_{2}N)_{2}PCl + 2 Et_{2}NH_{2}Cl

Illustrative of its utility is the synthesis of 1,2-bis(dichlorophosphino)benzene. The synthesis involves sequential lithiation of 1,2-dibromobenzene followed by treatment with (Et_{2}N)_{2}PCl:

C_{6}H_{4}Br_{2} + BuLi → C_{6}H_{4}(Br)Li + BuBr
C_{6}H_{4}(Br)Li + (Et_{2}N)_{2}PCl → C_{6}H_{4}(Br)(P(NEt_{2})_{2}) + LiCl
C_{6}H_{4}(Br)(P(NEt_{2})_{2}) + BuLi → C_{6}H_{4}(Li)(P(NEt_{2})_{2}) + BuBr
C_{6}H_{4}(Li)(P(NEt_{2})_{2}) + (Et_{2}N)_{2}PCl → C_{6}H_{4}[P(NEt_{2})_{2}]_{2} + LiCl

Finally, the amino substituents are removed using hydrogen chloride:

C_{6}H_{4}[P(NEt_{2})_{2}]_{2} + 8 HCl → C_{6}H_{4}(PCl_{2})_{2} + 4 Et_{2}NH_{2}Cl
