= 1,2-Bis(dichlorophosphino)benzene =

Names
- Preferred IUPAC name (1,2-Phenylene)bis(phosphonous dichloride)

Identifiers
| CAS Number | 82495-67-8 |
| 3D model (JSmol) | Interactive image |
| ChemSpider | 2564296 |
| PubChem CID | 3316562 |
| UNII | P6AM9992RB |
| CompTox Dashboard (EPA) | DTXSID10391390 |
- InChI: InChI=1S/C6H4Cl4P2/c7-11(8)5-3-1-2-4-6(5)12(9)10/h1-4H Key: IGYHSFVSIYJSML-UHFFFAOYSA-N
- SMILES: C1=CC=C(C(=C1)P(Cl)Cl)P(Cl)Cl

Properties
| Chemical formula | C_{6}H_{4}Cl_{4}P_{2} |
| Molar mass | 279.85 g·mol^{−1} |
| Appearance | colorless liquid |
| Boiling point | 97–99 °C (207–210 °F; 370–372 K) 0.001 torr |

Hazards
- GHS labelling
| Pictograms | (GHS05: Corrosive) |
| Signal word | Danger |
| Hazard statements | H314 |
| Precautionary statements | P260, P264, P280, P301+P330+P331, P303+P361+P353, P304+P340, P305+P351+P338, P310, P321, P363, P405, P501 |
- Except where otherwise noted, data are given for materials in their standard state (at 25 °C [77 °F], 100 kPa). Infobox references

1,2-Bis(dichlorophosphino)benzene is an organophosphorus compound with the formula C_{6}H_{4}(PCl_{2})_{2}. This viscous colorless liquid is a precursor to chelating diphosphines of the type C_{6}H_{4}(PR_{2})_{2}. It is prepared from 1,2-dibromobenzene by sequential lithiation followed by treatment with (Et_{2}N)_{2}PCl (Et = ethyl), which affords C_{6}H_{4}[P(NEt_{2})_{2}]_{2}. This species is finally cleaved with hydrogen chloride:

C_{6}H_{4}[P(NEt_{2})_{2}]_{2} + 8 HCl → C_{6}H_{4}(PCl_{2})_{2} + 4 Et_{2}NH_{2}Cl

== Related compounds ==
- 1,2-Bis(dichlorophosphino)ethane
