= 1,2-Bis(diisopropylphosphino)ethane =

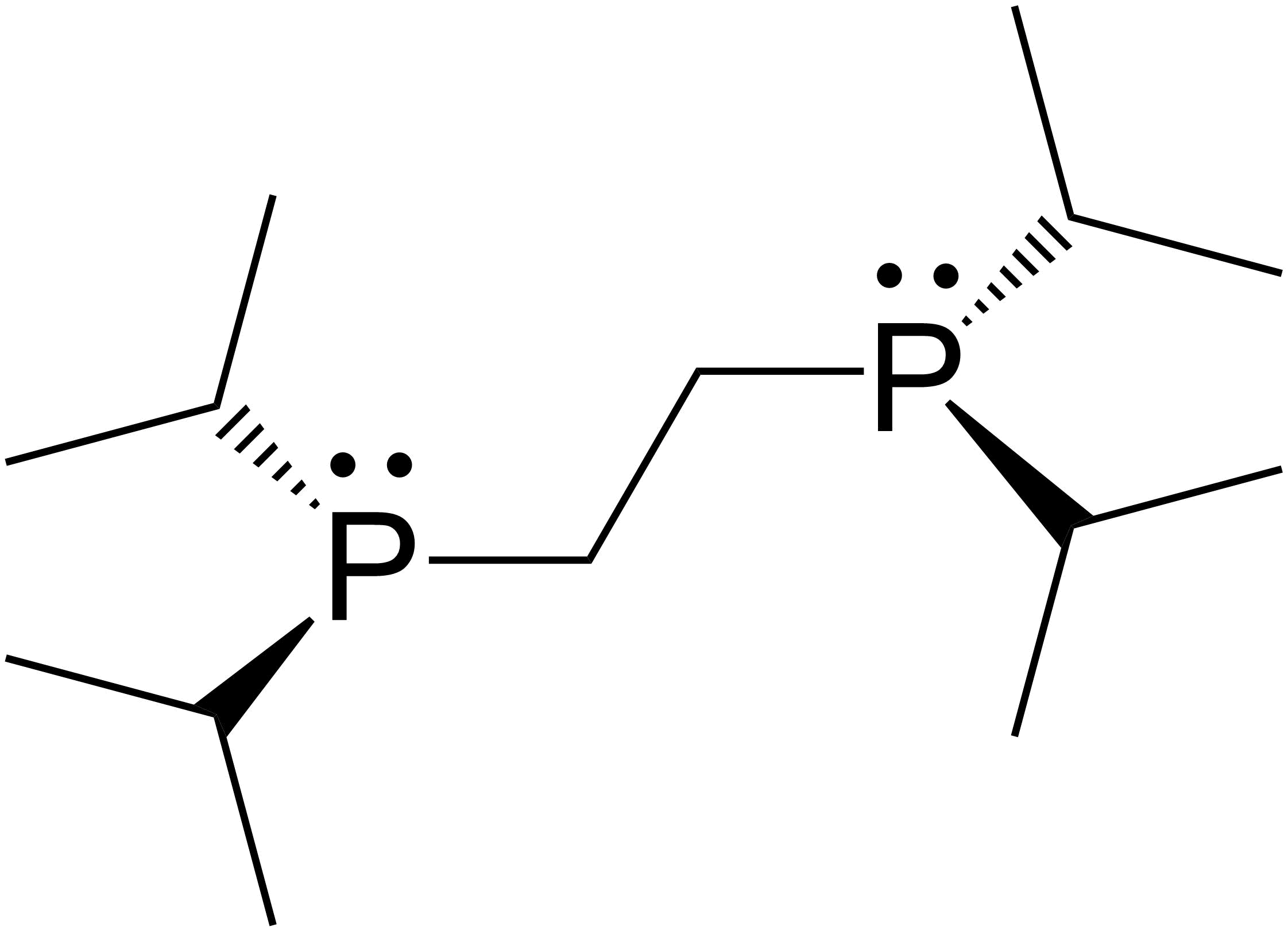

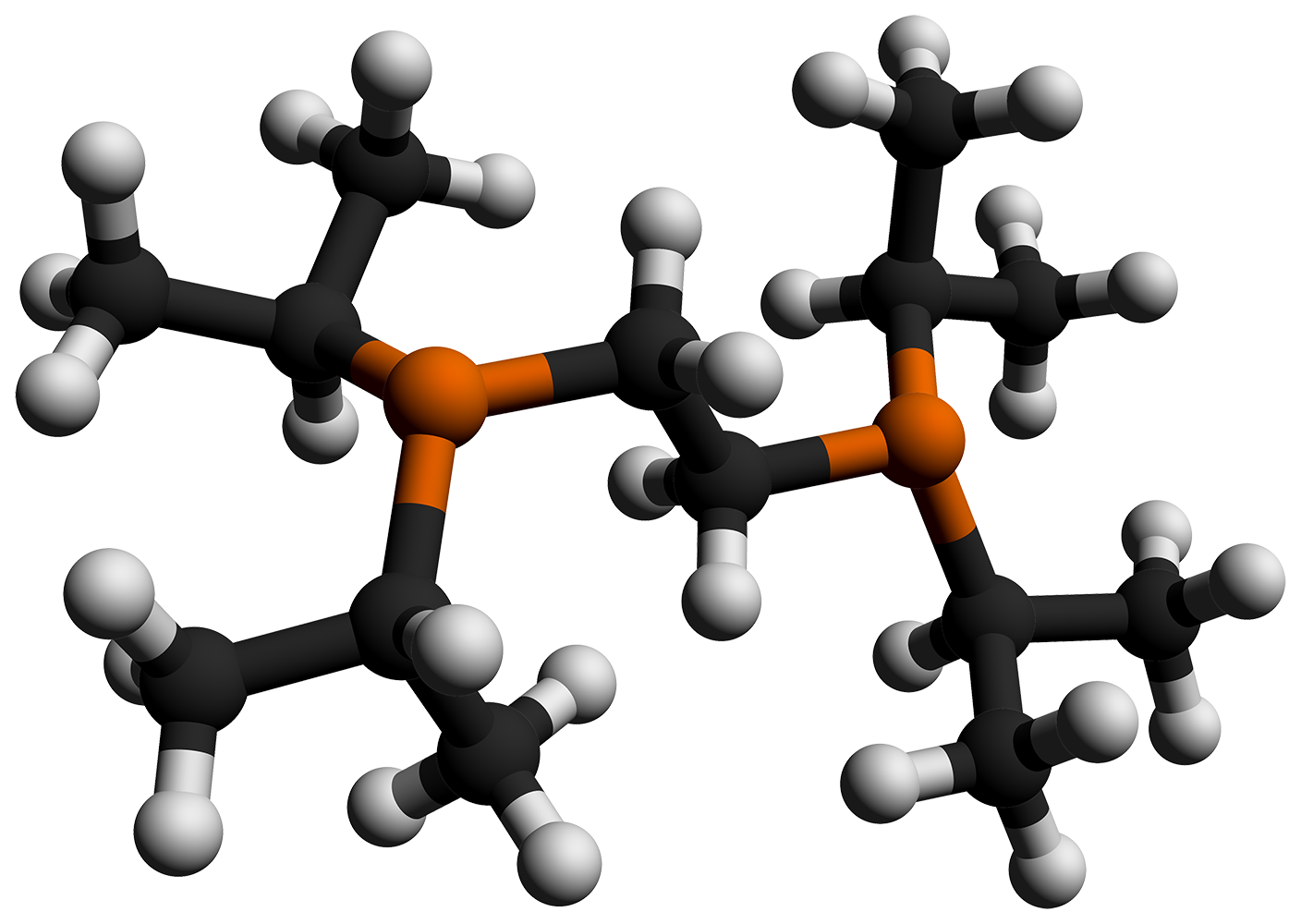

Names
- Preferred IUPAC name (Ethane-1,2-diyl)bis[di(propan-2-yl)phosphane]
- Other names dippe

Identifiers
CAS Number	87532-69-2
3D model (JSmol)	Interactive image
ChemSpider	464926
PubChem CID	533625
UNII	D9S95JVG7T
CompTox Dashboard (EPA)	DTXSID70336409
- InChI: InChI=1S/C14H32P2/c1-11(2)15(12(3)4)9-10-16(13(5)6)14(7)8/h11-14H,9-10H2,1-8H3 Key: RMFRFTSSEHRKKW-UHFFFAOYSA-N
- SMILES: P(C(C)C)(CCP(C(C)C)C(C)C)C(C)C

Properties
Chemical formula	C_{14}H_{32}P_{2}
Molar mass	262.358 g·mol^{−1}
- Except where otherwise noted, data are given for materials in their standard state (at 25 °C [77 °F], 100 kPa). verify (what is ?) Infobox references

1,2-Bis(diisopropylphosphino)ethane (dippe) is a commonly used bidentate ligand in coordination chemistry. An efficient synthesis from the parent phosphine oxides has been published.

This compound is similar to the ligand 1,2-bis(diphenylphosphino)ethane (dppe), with the substitution of isopropyl groups for phenyl groups.
