= Phosphorus trichloride =

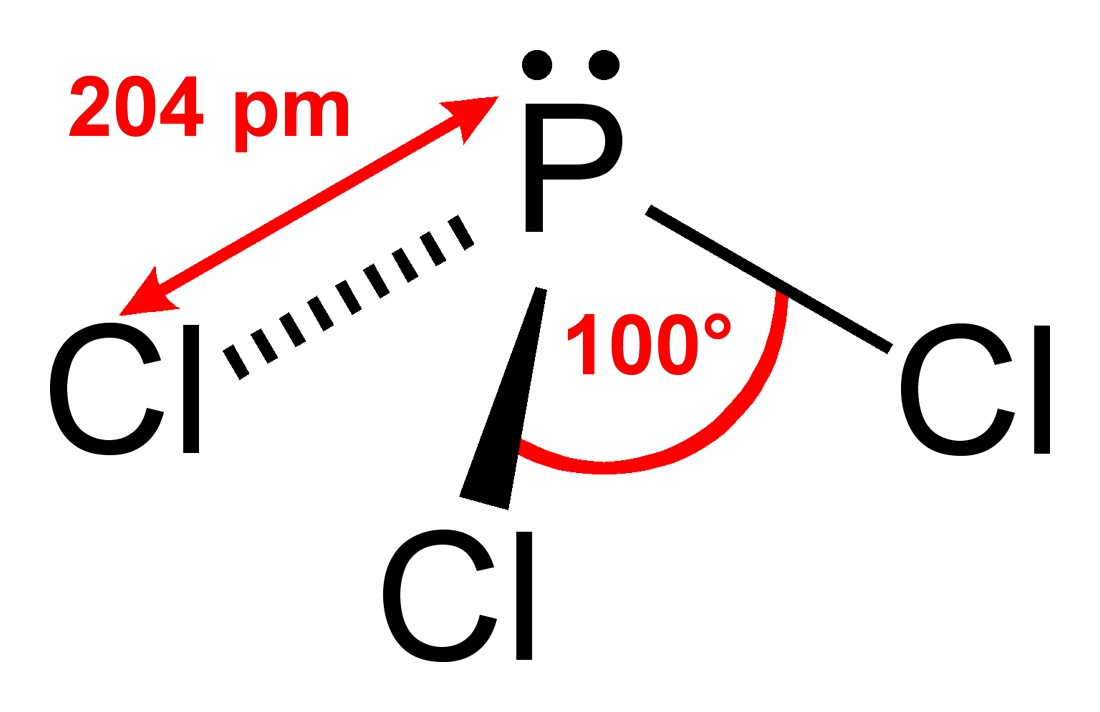
- Phosphorus trichloride

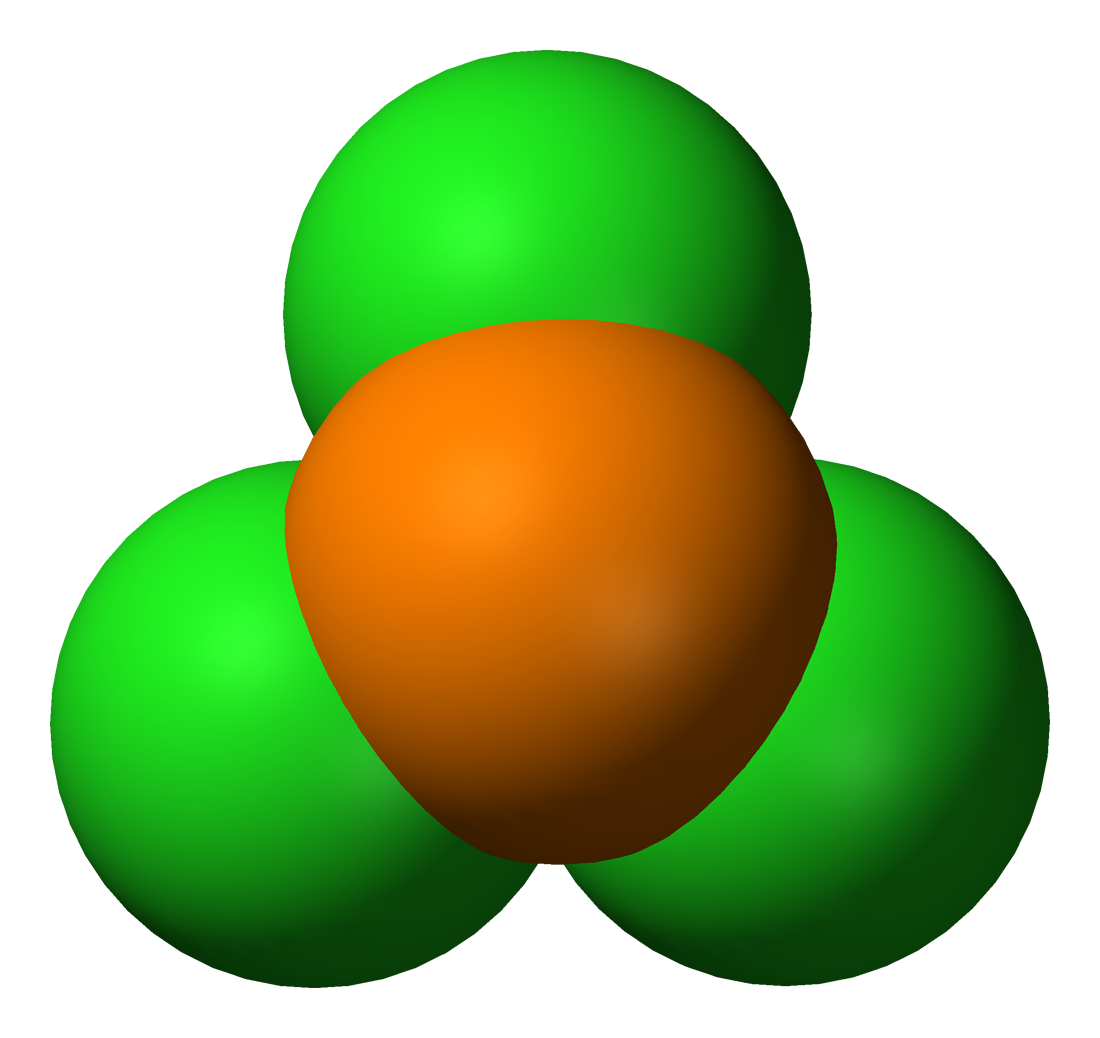
- Phosphorus trichloride

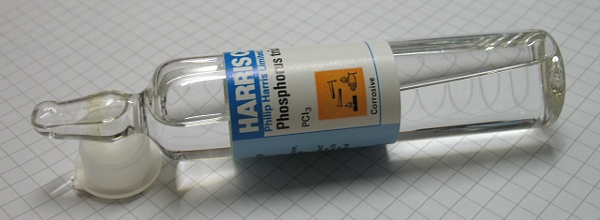

Names
- IUPAC name Phosphorus trichloride
- Systematic IUPAC name Trichlorophosphane
- Other names Phosphorus(III) chloride Phosphorous chloride

Identifiers
CAS Number	7719-12-2
3D model (JSmol)	Interactive image
ChEBI	CHEBI:30334
ChemSpider	22798
ECHA InfoCard	100.028.864
EC Number	231-749-3
PubChem CID	24387
RTECS number	TH3675000
UNII	M97C0A6S8U
UN number	1809
CompTox Dashboard (EPA)	DTXSID5029687
- InChI: InChI=1S/Cl3P/c1-4(2)3 Key: FAIAAWCVCHQXDN-UHFFFAOYSA-N
- SMILES: ClP(Cl)Cl

Properties
Chemical formula	PCl_{3}
Molar mass	137.33 g/mol
Appearance	Colorless to yellow fuming liquid
Odor	unpleasant, acrid, smells like HCl from rapid hydrolysis caused by atmospheric moisture
Density	1.574 g/cm^{3}
Melting point	−93.6 °C (−136.5 °F; 179.6 K)
Boiling point	76.1 °C (169.0 °F; 349.2 K)
Solubility in water	hydrolyzes
Solubility in other solvents	soluble in benzene, CS_{2}, ether, chloroform, CCl_{4}, halogenated organic solvents reacts with ethanol
Vapor pressure	13.3 kPa
Magnetic susceptibility (χ)	−63.4·10^{−6} cm^{3}/mol
Refractive index (n_{D})	1.5122 (21 °C)
Viscosity	0.65 cP (0 °C); 0.438 cP (50 °C)
Dipole moment	0.97 D

Thermochemistry
Std enthalpy of formation (Δ_{f}H^{⦵}_{298})	−319.7 kJ/mol

Hazards
- Occupational safety and health (OHS/OSH)
Main hazards	Highly toxic and corrosive
- GHS labelling
Pictograms	(GHS06: Toxic) (GHS08: Health hazard) (GHS05: Corrosive)
Signal word	Danger
Hazard statements	H300, H301, H314, H330, H373
Precautionary statements	P260, P273, P284, P303+P361+P353, P304+P340+P310, P305+P351+P338
NFPA 704 (fire diamond)	4 0 2 W
- Lethal dose or concentration (LD, LC)
LD_{50} (median dose)	18 mg/kg (rat, oral)
LC_{50} (median concentration)	104 ppm (rat, 4 hr); 50 ppm (guinea pig, 4 hr)
- NIOSH (US health exposure limits)
PEL (Permissible)	TWA 0.5 ppm (3 mg/m^{3})
REL (Recommended)	TWA 0.2 ppm (1.5 mg/m^{3}) ST 0.5 ppm (3 mg/m^{3})
IDLH (Immediate danger)	25 ppm
Safety data sheet (SDS)	ICSC 0696

Related compounds
Related phosphorus chlorides	Phosphorus pentachloride Phosphorus oxychloride Diphosphorus tetrachloride
Related compounds	Phosphorus trifluoride Phosphorus tribromide Phosphorus triiodide

Supplementary data page
- Phosphorus trichloride (data page)
- Except where otherwise noted, data are given for materials in their standard state (at 25 °C [77 °F], 100 kPa). verify (what is ?) Infobox references

Phosphorus trichloride is an inorganic compound with the chemical formula PCl_{3}. A colorless liquid when pure, it is an important industrial chemical, being used for the manufacture of phosphites and other organophosphorus compounds. It is toxic and reacts readily with water or air to release hydrogen chloride fumes.

== History ==
Phosphorus trichloride was first prepared in 1808 by the French chemists Joseph Louis Gay-Lussac and Louis Jacques Thénard by heating calomel (Hg_{2}Cl_{2}) with white phosphorus. Later during the same year, the English chemist Humphry Davy produced phosphorus trichloride by burning white phosphorus in chlorine gas.

== Preparation ==
World production exceeds one-third of a million tonnes. Phosphorus trichloride is prepared industrially by the reaction of chlorine with white phosphorus, using phosphorus trichloride as the solvent. In this continuous process PCl_{3} is removed as it is formed in order to avoid the formation of PCl_{5}.

P_{4} + 6 Cl_{2} → 4 PCl_{3}

== Structure and spectroscopy ==
It has a trigonal pyramidal shape. Its ^{31}P NMR spectrum exhibits a singlet around +220 ppm with reference to a phosphoric acid standard.

== Reactions ==
The phosphorus in PCl_{3} is often considered to have the +3 oxidation state and the chlorine atoms are considered to be in the −1 oxidation state. Most of its reactivity is consistent with this description.

=== Oxidation ===
PCl_{3} is a precursor to other phosphorus compounds, undergoing oxidation to phosphorus pentachloride (PCl_{5}), thiophosphoryl chloride (PSCl_{3}), or phosphorus oxychloride (POCl_{3}).

=== PCl_{3} as an electrophile ===
PCl_{3} reacts vigorously with water to form phosphorous acid (H_{3}PO_{3}) and hydrochloric acid:

PCl_{3} + 3 H_{2}O → H_{3}PO_{3} + 3 HCl

Phosphorus trichloride is the precursor to organophosphorus compounds. It reacts with phenol to give triphenyl phosphite:

3 PhOH + PCl_{3} → P(OPh)_{3} + 3 HCl (Ph = C_{6}H_{5})

Alcohols such as ethanol react similarly in the presence of a base such as a tertiary amine:

PCl_{3} + 3 EtOH + 3 R_{_{3}}N → P(OEt)_{3} + 3 R_{3}NH^{+}Cl^{−}

With one equivalent of alcohol and in the absence of base, the first product is alkoxyphosphorodichloridite:

PCl_{3} + EtOH → PCl_{2}(OEt) + HCl

In the absence of base, however, with excess alcohol, phosphorus trichloride converts to diethylphosphite:

PCl_{3} + 3 EtOH → (EtO)_{2}P(O)H + 2 HCl + EtCl

Secondary amines (R_{2}NH) form aminophosphines. For example, bis(diethylamino)chlorophosphine, is obtained from direct reaction of diethylamine and PCl_{3}. Thiols (RSH) form P(SR)_{3}. An industrially relevant reaction of PCl_{3} with amines is phosphonomethylation, which employs formaldehyde:

R_{2}NH + PCl_{3} + CH_{2}O → (HO)_{2}P(O)CH_{2}NR_{2} + 3 HCl

The common herbicide glyphosate is produced this way.

The reaction of PCl_{3} with Grignard reagents and organolithium reagents is a useful method for the preparation of organic phosphines with the formula R_{3}P (sometimes called phosphanes) such as triphenylphosphine, Ph_{3}P.

3 RMgBr + PCl_{3} → R_{3}P + 3 MgBrCl

Triphenylphosphine is produced industrially by the reaction between phosphorus trichloride, chlorobenzene, and sodium:

PCl_{3} + 3 PhCl + 6 Na → PPh_{3} + 6 NaCl, where Ph = C_{6}H_{5}

Under controlled conditions or especially with bulky R groups, similar reactions afford less substituted derivatives such as chlorodiisopropylphosphine.

=== Conversion of alcohols to alkyl chlorides ===
Phosphorus trichloride is commonly used to convert primary and secondary alcohols to the corresponding chlorides. As discussed above, the reaction of alcohols with phosphorus trichloride is sensitive to conditions. The mechanism for the ROH →RCl conversion involves the reaction of HCl with phosphite esters:

P(OR)_{3} + HCl ⇌ HP(OR)^{+}_{3}Cl^{−}
HP(OR)^{+}_{3}Cl^{−} → RCl + HOP(OR)_{2}.

HOP(OR)_{2} + HCl ⇌ H_{2}OP(OR)^{+}_{2}Cl^{−}
H_{2}OP(OR)^{+}_{2}Cl^{−} → RCl + (HO)_{2}P(OR)

(HO)_{2}P(OR) + HCl ⇌ H(HO)_{2}P(OR)^{+}Cl^{−}
H(HO)_{2}P(OR)^{+}Cl^{−} → RCl + (HO)_{3}P

The first step proceeds with nearly ideal stereochemistry but the final step far less so owing to an SN1 pathway.

=== Redox reactions ===
Phosphorus trichloride undergoes a variety of redox reactions:

3PCl_{3} + 2 CrO_{3} → 3POCl_{3} + Cr_{2}O_{3}
PCl_{3} + SO_{3} → POCl_{3} + SO_{2}
3 PCl_{3} + SO_{2} → 2POCl_{3} + PSCl_{3}

=== PCl_{3} as a nucleophile ===
Phosphorus trichloride has a lone pair, and therefore can act as a Lewis base, e.g., forming a 1:1 adduct Br_{3}B-PCl_{3}. Metal complexes such as Ni(PCl_{3})_{4} are known, again demonstrating the ligand properties of PCl_{3}.

This Lewis basicity is exploited in the Kinnear–Perren reaction to prepare alkylphosphonyl dichlorides (RP(O)Cl_{2}) and alkylphosphonate esters (RP(O)(OR')_{2}). Alkylation of phosphorus trichloride is effected in the presence of aluminium trichloride give the alkyltrichlorophosphonium salts, which are versatile intermediates:

PCl_{3} + RCl + AlCl_{3} → RPCl^{+}_{3} + AlCl^{−}_{4}

The RPCl^{+}_{3} product can then be decomposed with water to produce an alkylphosphonic dichloride RP(=O)Cl_{2}.

=== PCl_{3} as a ligand ===
PCl_{3}, like the more popular phosphorus trifluoride, is a ligand in coordination chemistry. One example is Mo(CO)_{5}PCl_{3}.

== Uses ==
PCl_{3} is important indirectly as a precursor to PCl_{5}, POCl_{3} and PSCl_{3}, which are used in the synthesis of herbicides, insecticides, plasticisers, oil additives, and flame retardants.

For example, oxidation of PCl_{3} gives POCl_{3}, which is used for the manufacture of triphenyl phosphate and tricresyl phosphate, which find application as flame retardants and plasticisers for PVC.

PCl_{3} is the precursor to triphenylphosphine for the Wittig reaction, and phosphite esters which may be used as industrial intermediates, or used in the Horner-Wadsworth-Emmons reaction, both important methods for making alkenes. It can be used to make trioctylphosphine oxide (TOPO), used as an extraction agent, although TOPO is usually made via the corresponding phosphine.

PCl_{3} is also used directly as a reagent in organic synthesis. It is used to convert primary and secondary alcohols into alkyl chlorides, or carboxylic acids into acyl chlorides, although thionyl chloride generally gives better yields than PCl_{3}.

== Safety ==
- 600 ppm is lethal in just a few minutes.
- 25 ppm is the US NIOSH "Immediately Dangerous to Life and Health" level
- 0.5 ppm is the US OSHA "permissible exposure limit" over a time-weighted average of 8 hours.
- 0.2 ppm is the US NIOSH "recommended exposure limit" over a time-weighted average of 8 hours.
- Under EU Directive 67/548/EEC, PCl_{3} is classified as very toxic and corrosive, and the risk phrases R14, R26/28, R35 and R48/20 are obligatory.

Industrial production of phosphorus trichloride is controlled under the Chemical Weapons Convention, where it is listed in schedule 3, as it can be used to produce mustard agents.

== See also ==
- Phosphorus pentachloride
- Phosphoryl chloride
- Phosphorus trifluorodichloride
