= Chlorodiisopropylphosphine =

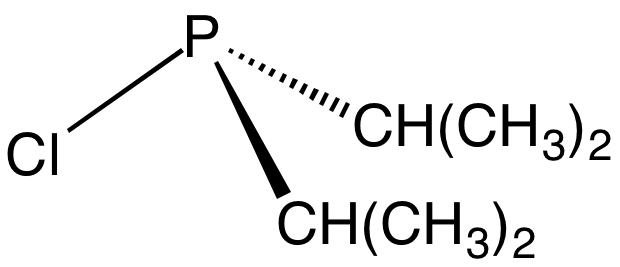

Names
- Preferred IUPAC name Di(propan-2-yl)phosphinous chloride

Identifiers
CAS Number	40244-90-4
3D model (JSmol)	Interactive image
ChemSpider	469344
ECHA InfoCard	100.157.609
EC Number	629-426-0
PubChem CID	538967
UNII	5FG5N54CYB
CompTox Dashboard (EPA)	DTXSID10337132
- InChI: InChI=1S/C6H14ClP/c1-5(2)8(7)6(3)4/h5-6H,1-4H3 Key: JZPDBTOWHLZQFC-UHFFFAOYSA-N; InChI=1/C6H14ClP/c1-5(2)8(7)6(3)4/h5-6H,1-4H3 Key: JZPDBTOWHLZQFC-UHFFFAOYAH
- SMILES: CC(C)P(C(C)C)Cl

Properties
Chemical formula	C_{6}H_{14}ClP
Molar mass	152.60 g·mol^{−1}
Appearance	colorless liquid
Density	0.959 g/mL at 25 °C
Boiling point	46-47 °C (10 mm of Hg)
Solubility in water	Reacts

Hazards
- Occupational safety and health (OHS/OSH)
Main hazards	Toxic, reacts with water to release HCl
- GHS labelling
Pictograms	(GHS02: Flammable) (GHS05: Corrosive)
Signal word	Danger
Hazard statements	H225, H314
Precautionary statements	P210, P233, P240, P241, P242, P243, P260, P264, P280, P301+P330+P331, P302+P361+P354, P303+P361+P353, P304+P340, P305+P354+P338, P316, P321, P363, P370+P378, P403+P235, P405, P501
- Except where otherwise noted, data are given for materials in their standard state (at 25 °C [77 °F], 100 kPa). Infobox references

Chlorodiisopropylphosphine is an organophosphorus compound with the formula [(CH_{3})_{2}CH]_{2}PCl. It is a colorless liquid that reacts with water and oxygen. The compound is used to prepare tertiary phosphines and phosphinite ligands.

== Synthesis and reactions ==
The compound is prepared by treating phosphorus trichloride with the Grignard reagent isopropylmagnesium chloride:

PCl_{3} + 2 (CH_{3})_{2}CHMgCl → [(CH_{3})_{2}CH]_{2}PCl + 2 MgCl_{2}

Relative to the reaction of less hindered Grignard reagents with PCl_{3}, this reaction affords a superior yield of the monochloro derivative.

Chlorodiisopropylphosphine reacts with Grignard reagents and organolithium compounds to give phosphines:

[(CH_{3})_{2}CH]_{2}PCl + RM → [(CH_{3})_{2}CH]_{2}PR + MCl

Chlorodiisopropylphosphine reacts with alcohols and phenols to give phosphinites, this reaction typically is conducted in the presence of a base:

[(CH_{3})_{2}CH]_{2}PCl + ROH → [(CH_{3})_{2}CH]_{2}POR + HCl

Phosphinites are versatile ligands.
