= 1,2-Bis(dicyclohexylphosphino)ethane =

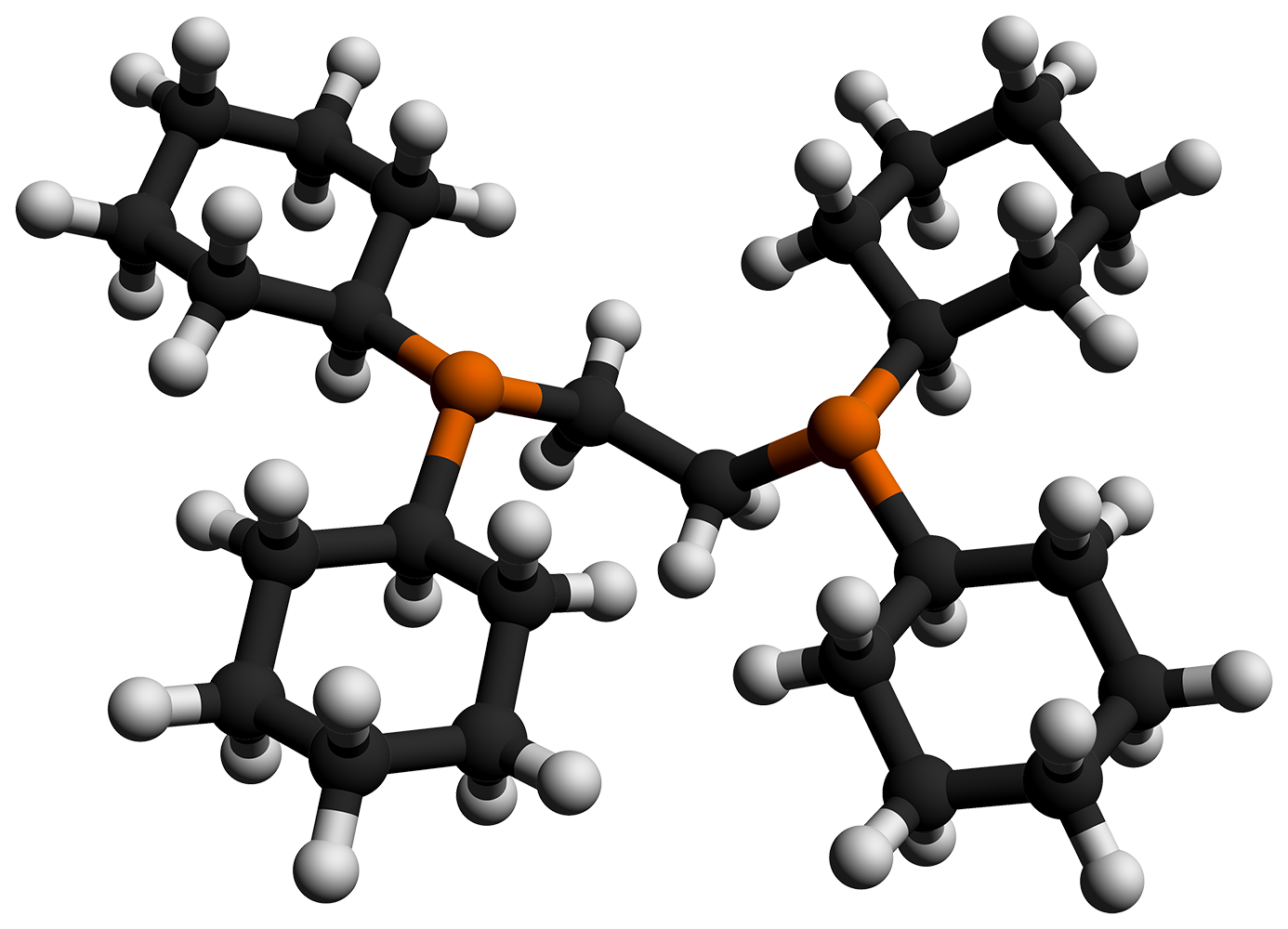

Names
- Preferred IUPAC name (Ethane-1,2-diyl)bis(dicyclohexylphosphane)
- Other names dcpe

Identifiers
CAS Number	23743-26-2
3D model (JSmol)	Interactive image
ChemSpider	465407
ECHA InfoCard	100.209.704
PubChem CID	534202
UNII	DG2ZG8EGQ2
CompTox Dashboard (EPA)	DTXSID90336507
- InChI: InChI=1S/C26H48P2/c1-5-13-23(14-6-1)27(24-15-7-2-8-16-24)21-22-28(25-17-9-3-10-18-25)26-19-11-4-12-20-26/h23-26H,1-22H2 Key: BOUYBUIVMHNXQB-UHFFFAOYSA-N; InChI=1/C26H48P2/c1-5-13-23(14-6-1)27(24-15-7-2-8-16-24)21-22-28(25-17-9-3-10-18-25)26-19-11-4-12-20-26/h23-26H,1-22H2 Key: BOUYBUIVMHNXQB-UHFFFAOYAM
- SMILES: C1CCC(CC1)P(CCP(C2CCCCC2)C3CCCCC3)C4CCCCC4

Properties
Chemical formula	C_{26}H_{48}P_{2}
Molar mass	422.61
Appearance	white solid
Melting point	96–97 °C (205–207 °F; 369–370 K)
- Except where otherwise noted, data are given for materials in their standard state (at 25 °C [77 °F], 100 kPa). Infobox references

Bis(dicyclohexylphosphino)ethane, abbreviated dcpe, is an organophosphorus compound with the formula (C_{6}H_{11})_{2}PCH_{2}CH_{2}P(C_{6}H_{11})_{2}. It is a white solid that is soluble in nonpolar organic solvents. The compound is used as a bulky and highly basic diphosphine ligand in coordination chemistry.
