= A-frame complex =

Coordination compound with 2 bridging ligands and an atom bridge

In organometallic chemistry, A-frame complexes are coordination compounds that contain two bridging bidentate ligands and a single atom bridge. They have the formula M_{2}(μ-X)(bd)_{2}L_{2}, where bd is a bidentate ligand like dppm, and X and L are a wide variety of ligands. The term was coined to describe products arising from the oxidative addition to Rh(I)Rh(I) complexes.

== Scope of compounds ==
A-frame complexes typically consist of a pair of square-planar metal centres. Consequently, this family of complexes is found for those metals that tend to adopt that geometry, Rh, Ir, Ni, Pd, Pt, and Au. In addition to dppm, the analogous tetramethyldiphosphine (dmpm) also forms such complexes as do some related ligands, such as diphenyl-2-pyridylphosphine. The bridging site can be occupied by a variety of ligands, including CO, SO, NO, CH_{2}, hydride, and chloride.

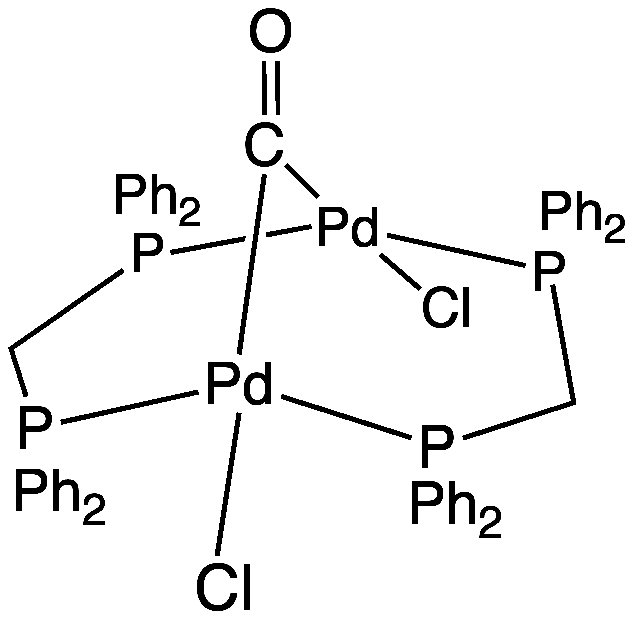
The A-frame complex Pd_{2}Cl_{2}(CO)(dppm)_{2}.

The A-frame sawhorse, the (imperfect) structural metaphor for the A-frame complexes.

== Preparation ==
A frame complexes are often produced by the addition of reagents of the type AX_{2} to low valent complexes of dppm:

2 M(0) + AX_{2} + 2 dppm → M_{2}(μ-A)(dppm)_{2}X_{2}

Alternatively the group "A" can be added across a preformed M-M bond, as indicated by the oxidative addition of elemental sulfur:

Pd_{2}(dppm)_{2}Cl_{2} + S → Pd_{2}(μ-S)(dppm)_{2}Cl_{2}
