= 1,2-Bis(diphenylphosphino)ethane =

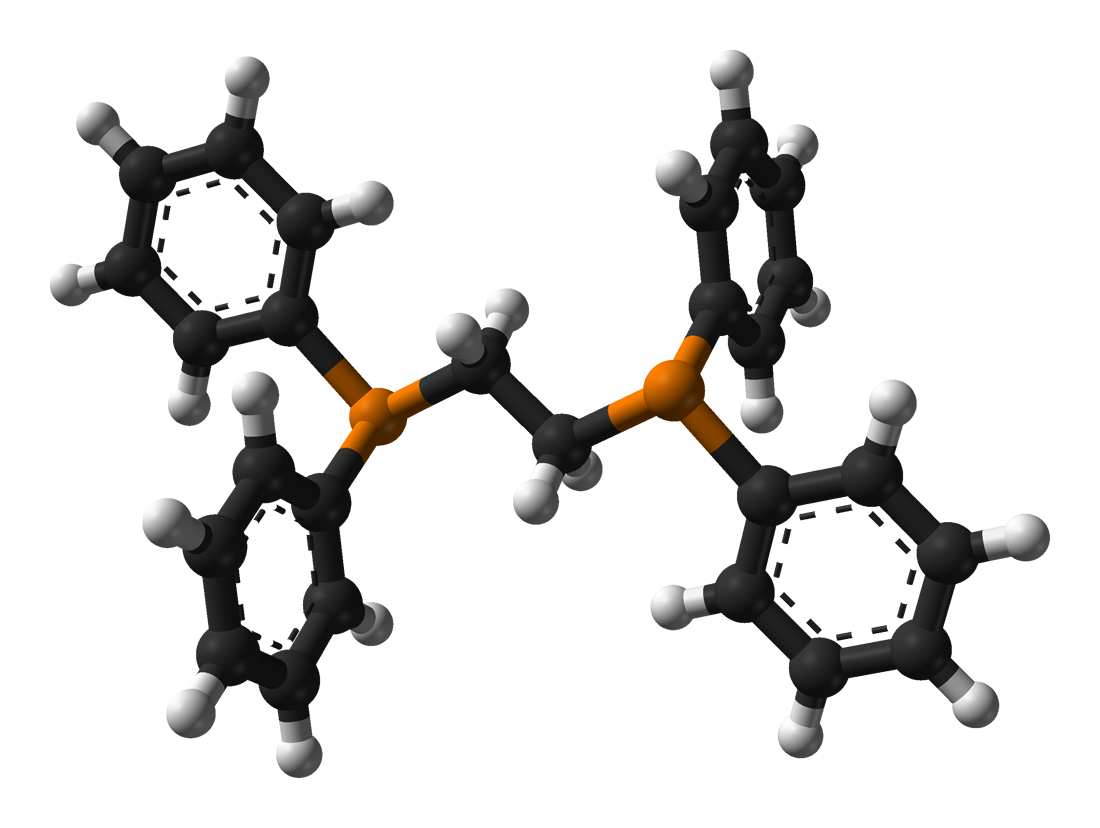
- dppe

Names
- Preferred IUPAC name (Ethane-1,2-diyl)bis(diphenylphosphane)
- Other names 1,2-Bis(diphenylphosphino)ethane; Diphos; Dppe

Identifiers
| CAS Number | 1663-45-2 |
| 3D model (JSmol) | Interactive image; Interactive image |
| Beilstein Reference | 761261 |
| ChEBI | CHEBI:30669 |
| ChEMBL | ChEMBL68683 |
| ChemSpider | 66873 |
| ECHA InfoCard | 100.015.246 |
| EC Number | 216-769-2 |
| Gmelin Reference | 9052 |
| PubChem CID | 74267 |
| UNII | KL33QE52I4 |
| CompTox Dashboard (EPA) | DTXSID2061858 |
- InChI: InChI=1S/C26H24P2/c1-5-13-23(14-6-1)27(24-15-7-2-8-16-24)21-22-28(25-17-9-3-10-18-25)26-19-11-4-12-20-26/h1-20H,21-22H2 Key: QFMZQPDHXULLKC-UHFFFAOYSA-N; InChI=1/C26H24P2/c1-5-13-23(14-6-1)27(24-15-7-2-8-16-24)21-22-28(25-17-9-3-10-18-25)26-19-11-4-12-20-26/h1-20H,21-22H2 Key: QFMZQPDHXULLKC-UHFFFAOYAX
- SMILES: P(c1ccccc1)(c2ccccc2)CCP(c3ccccc3)c4ccccc4; c1ccc(cc1)P(CCP(c2ccccc2)c3ccccc3)c4ccccc4

Properties
| Chemical formula | C_{26}H_{24}P_{2} |
| Molar mass | 398.42 g/mol |
| Melting point | 140 to 142 °C (284 to 288 °F; 413 to 415 K) |

Hazards
- GHS labelling
| Pictograms | (GHS07: Exclamation mark) (GHS09: Environmental hazard) |
| Signal word | Warning |
| Hazard statements | H302, H315, H319, H332, H335, H410 |
| Precautionary statements | P261, P264, P270, P271, P273, P280, P301+P312, P302+P352, P304+P312, P304+P340, P305+P351+P338, P312, P321, P330, P332+P313, P337+P313, P362, P391, P403+P233, P405, P501 |
- Except where otherwise noted, data are given for materials in their standard state (at 25 °C [77 °F], 100 kPa). verify (what is ?) Infobox references

1,2-Bis(diphenylphosphino)ethane (dppe) is an organophosphorus compound with the formula (Ph_{2}PCH_{2})_{2} (Ph = phenyl). It is a common symmetrical bidentate ligand in coordination chemistry. It is a white solid that is soluble in organic solvents.

== Preparation ==
The preparation of dppe entails the alkylation of NaP(C_{6}H_{5})_{2} with 1,2-dichloroethane:

2 NaP(C_{6}H_{5})_{2} + ClCH_{2}CH_{2}Cl → (C_{6}H_{5})_{2}PCH_{2}CH_{2}P(C_{6}H_{5})_{2} + 2 NaCl

== Reactions ==
The reduction of dppe by lithium gives the disecondary phosphine:

(C_{6}H_{5})_{2}PCH_{2}CH_{2}P(C_{6}H_{5})_{2} 4 Li → Li(C_{6}H_{5})PCH_{2}CH_{2}P(C_{6}H_{5})Li + 2 C_{6}H_{5}Li

Hydrolysis gives the bis(secondary phosphine).

Li(C_{6}H_{5})PCH_{2}CH_{2}P(C_{6}H_{5})Li + 2 H_{2}O → H(C_{6}H_{5})PCH_{2}CH_{2}P(C_{6}H_{5})H + 2 LiOH

The bis(dppe) complex HFeCl(dppe)_{2} is one of the most accessible transition metal hydrides.

Treatment of dppe with hydrogen peroxide produces the phosphine oxides (C_{6}H_{5})_{2}P(O)CH_{2}CH_{2}P(C_{6}H_{5})_{2} and (C_{6}H_{5})_{2}P(O)CH_{2}CH_{2}P(O)(C_{6}H_{5})_{2}. Selective mono-oxidation of dppe can be achieved by benzylation followed by hydrolysis:

(C_{6}H_{5})_{2}PCH_{2}CH_{2}P(C_{6}H_{5})_{2} + C_{6}H_{5}CH_{2}Br → (C_{6}H_{5})_{2}PCH_{2}CH_{2}P(C_{6}H_{5})_{2}(CH_{2}C_{6}H_{5})]Br
(C_{6}H_{5})_{2}PCH_{2}CH_{2}P(C_{6}H_{5})_{2}(CH_{2}C_{6}H_{5})]Br + NaOH → (C_{6}H_{5})_{2}PCH_{2}CH_{2}P(O)(C_{6}H_{5})_{2} + C_{6}H_{5}CH_{3} + NaBr

Hydrogenation of dppe gives the ligand bis(dicyclohexylphosphino)ethane.

== Coordination complexes ==
Many coordination complexes of dppe are known, and some are used as homogeneous catalysts. Dppe is almost invariably chelating, although there are examples of monodentate (e.g., W(CO)_{5}(dppe)) and of bridging behavior. The natural bite angle is 86°.

== Related compounds ==
- 1,2-Bis(dimethylphosphino)ethane
- Bis(diphenylphosphino)methane
