= Chiraphos =

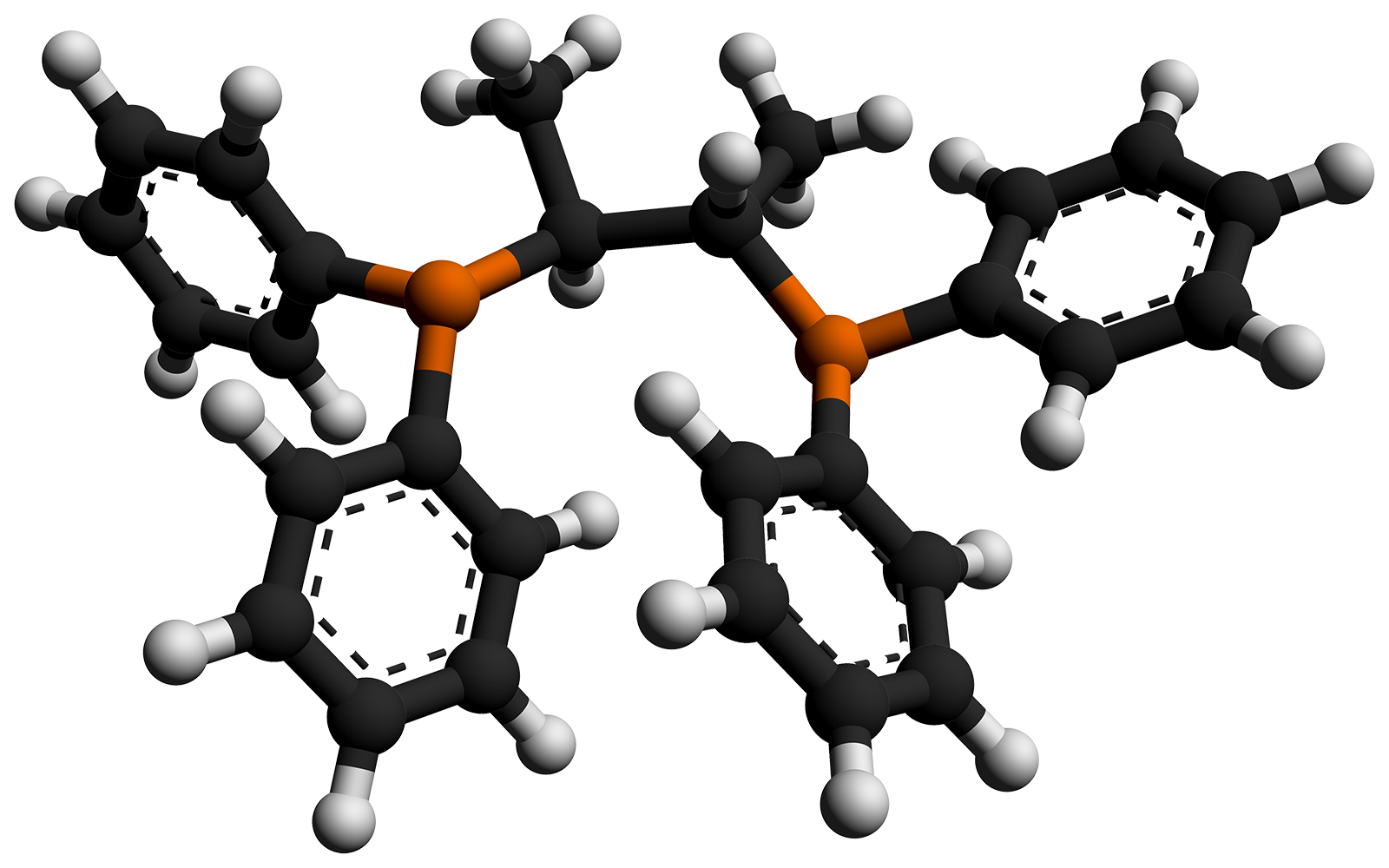

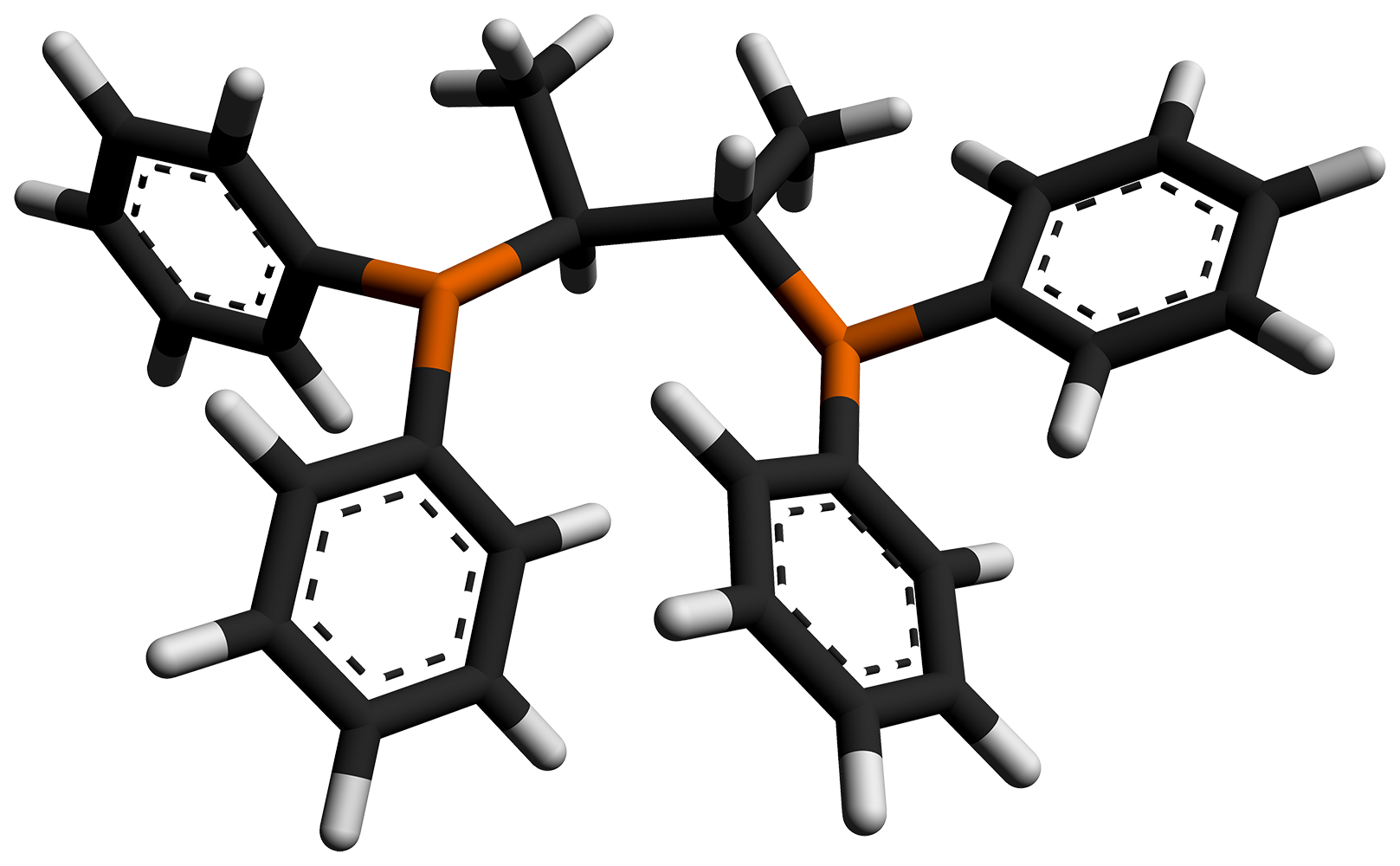

Names
- Preferred IUPAC name rel-[(2R,3R)-Butane-2,3-diyl]bis(diphenylphosphane)
- Other names: (2S,3S)-(–)-Bis(diphenylphosphino)butane; (2R,3R)-(+)-Bis(diphenylphosphino)butane

Identifiers
CAS Number	74839-84-2 (R,R); 64896-28-2 (S,S)
3D model (JSmol)	Interactive image
ChemSpider	8288775
ECHA InfoCard	100.152.152
PubChem CID	10113249
UNII	1T086B9Q1J (R,R); 6QR78GZL9B (S,S)
CompTox Dashboard (EPA)	DTXSID60435814
- InChI: InChI=1S/C28H28P2/c1-23(29(25-15-7-3-8-16-25)26-17-9-4-10-18-26)24(2)30(27-19-11-5-12-20-27)28-21-13-6-14-22-28/h3-24H,1-2H3/t23-,24-/m0/s1 Key: FWXAUDSWDBGCMN-ZEQRLZLVSA-N; InChI=1/C28H28P2/c1-23(29(25-15-7-3-8-16-25)26-17-9-4-10-18-26)24(2)30(27-19-11-5-12-20-27)28-21-13-6-14-22-28/h3-24H,1-2H3/t23-,24-/m0/s1 Key: FWXAUDSWDBGCMN-ZEQRLZLVBA
- SMILES: P(c1ccccc1)(c2ccccc2)[C@H]([C@@H](P(c3ccccc3)c4ccccc4)C)C

Properties
Chemical formula	C_{28}H_{28}P_{2}
Molar mass	426.47 g/mol
Appearance	White powder
Melting point	104 to 109 °C (219 to 228 °F; 377 to 382 K)

Hazards
- GHS labelling
Pictograms	(GHS07: Exclamation mark)
Signal word	Warning
Hazard statements	H315, H319, H335
Precautionary statements	P261, P264, P271, P280, P302+P352, P304+P340, P305+P351+P338, P312, P321, P332+P313, P337+P313, P362, P403+P233, P405, P501
- Except where otherwise noted, data are given for materials in their standard state (at 25 °C [77 °F], 100 kPa). verify (what is ?) Infobox references

Chiraphos is a chiral diphosphine employed as a ligand in organometallic chemistry. This bidentate ligand chelates metals via the two phosphine groups. Its name is derived from its description — being both chiral and a phosphine. As a C_{2}-symmetric ligand, chiraphos is available in two enantiomeric forms, S,S and R,R, each with C_{2} symmetry.

== Preparation ==
Chiraphos is prepared from S,S or R,R-2,3-butanediol, which are derived from commercially available S,S or R,R-tartaric acid; the technique of using cheaply available enantiopure starting materials is known as chiral pool synthesis. The diol is tosylated and then the ditosylate is treated with lithium diphenylphosphide. The ligand was an important demonstration of how the conformation of the chelate ring can affect asymmetric induction by a metal catalyst. Prior to this work, in most chiral phosphines, e.g., DIPAMP, phosphorus was the stereogenic center.

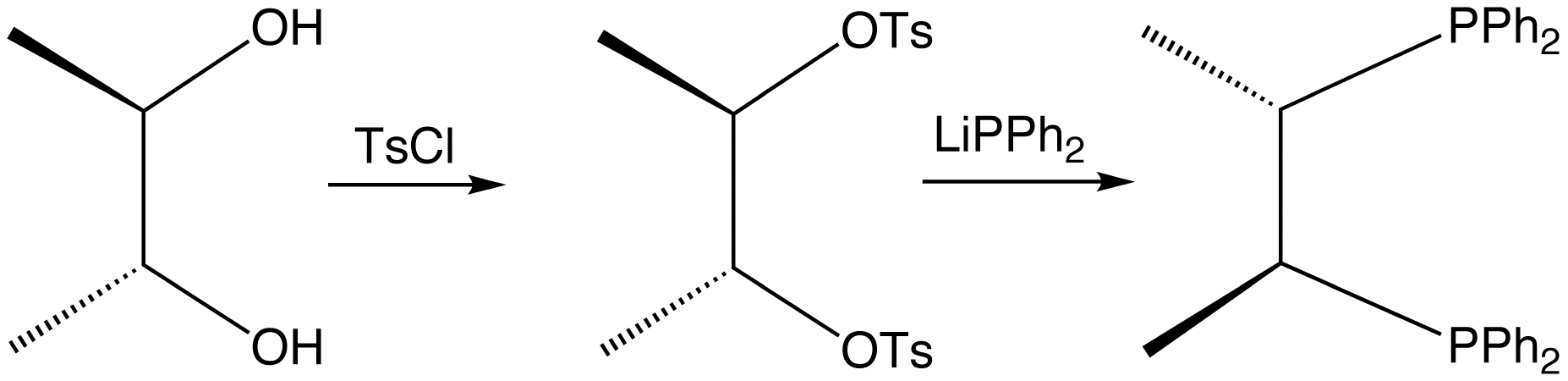
