= Bis(diphenylphosphino)methane =

1,1-bis(diphenylphosphino)methane
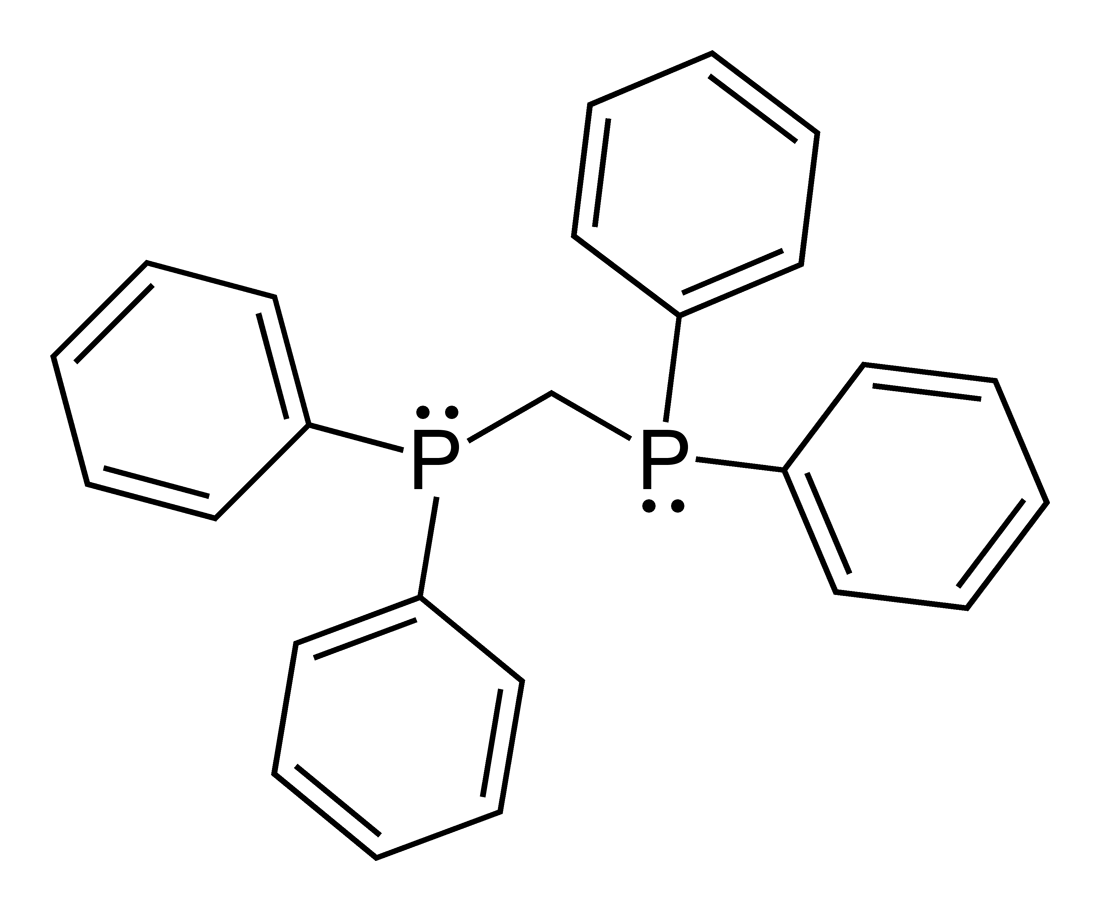

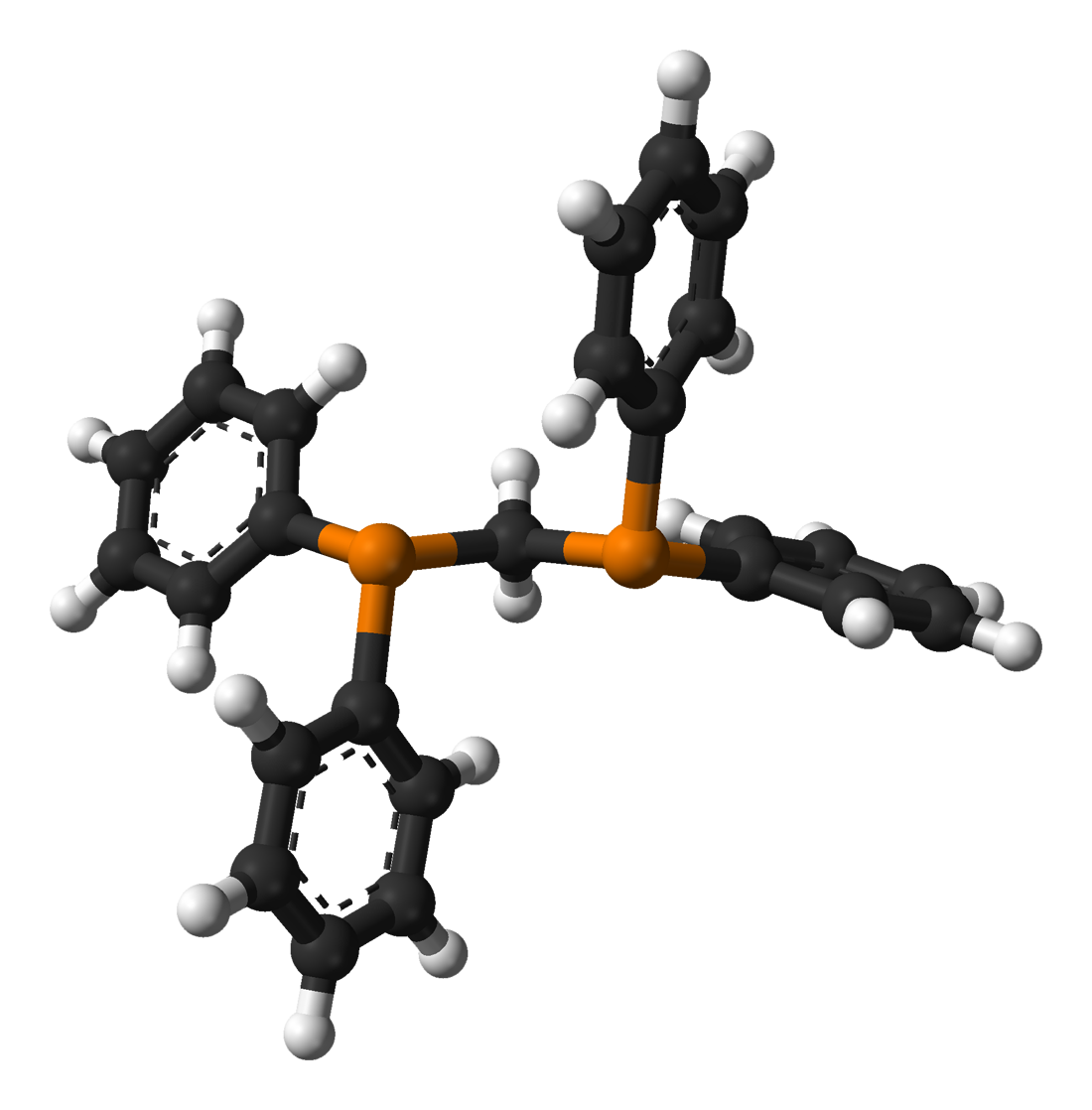

Names
- Preferred IUPAC name Methylenebis(diphenylphosphane)
- Other names Methylenebis(diphenylphosphine) dppm

Identifiers
CAS Number	2071-20-7
3D model (JSmol)	Interactive image
ChEMBL	ChEMBL307780
ChemSpider	67509
ECHA InfoCard	100.016.541
EC Number	218-194-2
PubChem CID	74952
UNII	I5O2HZR38V
CompTox Dashboard (EPA)	DTXSID10174766
- InChI: InChI=1S/C25H22P2/c1-5-13-22(14-6-1)26(23-15-7-2-8-16-23)21-27(24-17-9-3-10-18-24)25-19-11-4-12-20-25/h1-20H,21H2 Key: XGCDBGRZEKYHNV-UHFFFAOYSA-N; InChI=1/C25H22P2/c1-5-13-22(14-6-1)26(23-15-7-2-8-16-23)21-27(24-17-9-3-10-18-24)25-19-11-4-12-20-25/h1-20H,21H2 Key: XGCDBGRZEKYHNV-UHFFFAOYAH
- SMILES: P(c1ccccc1)(c2ccccc2)CP(c3ccccc3)c4ccccc4

Properties
Chemical formula	C_{25}H_{22}P_{2}
Molar mass	384.399 g·mol^{−1}
Appearance	White crystalline powder
Melting point	118 to 122 °C (244 to 252 °F; 391 to 395 K)
Solubility in water	Insoluble in water

Hazards
- GHS labelling
Pictograms	(GHS07: Exclamation mark)
Signal word	Warning
Hazard statements	H315, H319, H335
Precautionary statements	P261, P264, P271, P280, P302+P352, P304+P340, P305+P351+P338, P312, P321, P332+P313, P337+P313, P362, P403+P233, P405, P501
Safety data sheet (SDS)	External MSDS
- Except where otherwise noted, data are given for materials in their standard state (at 25 °C [77 °F], 100 kPa). verify (what is ?) Infobox references

1,1-Bis(diphenylphosphino)methane (dppm), is an organophosphorus compound with the formula CH_{2}(PPh_{2})_{2}. Dppm, a white, crystalline powder, is used in inorganic and organometallic chemistry as a ligand. It is more specifically a chelating ligand because it is a ligand that can bond to metals with two phosphorus donor atoms. The natural bite angle is 73°.

== Synthesis and reactivity ==
1,1-Bis(diphenylphosphino)methane was first prepared by the reaction of sodium diphenylphosphide (Ph_{2}PNa) with dichloromethane:

Ph_{3}P + 2 Na → Ph_{2}PNa + NaPh
2NaPPh_{2} + CH_{2}Cl_{2} → Ph_{2}PCH_{2}PPh_{2} + 2 NaCl

The methylene group (CH_{2}) in dppm (and especially its complexes) is mildly acidic. The ligand can be oxidized to give the corresponding oxides and sulfides CH_{2}[P(E)Ph_{2}]_{2} (E = O, S). The methylene group is even more acidic in these derivatives.

== Coordination chemistry ==
As a chelating ligand, 1,1-bis(diphenylphosphino)methane forms a four-membered ring with the constituents MP_{2}C. The ligand promotes the formation of bimetallic complexes that feature five-membered M_{2}P_{2}C rings. In this way, dppm promotes the formation of bimetallic complexes. One such example is the dipalladium chloride, Pd_{2}Cl_{2}(dppm)_{2}. In this complex, the oxidation state for the Pd centres are I. Bis(diphenylphosphino)methane gives rise to a family of coordination compounds known as A-frame complexes.

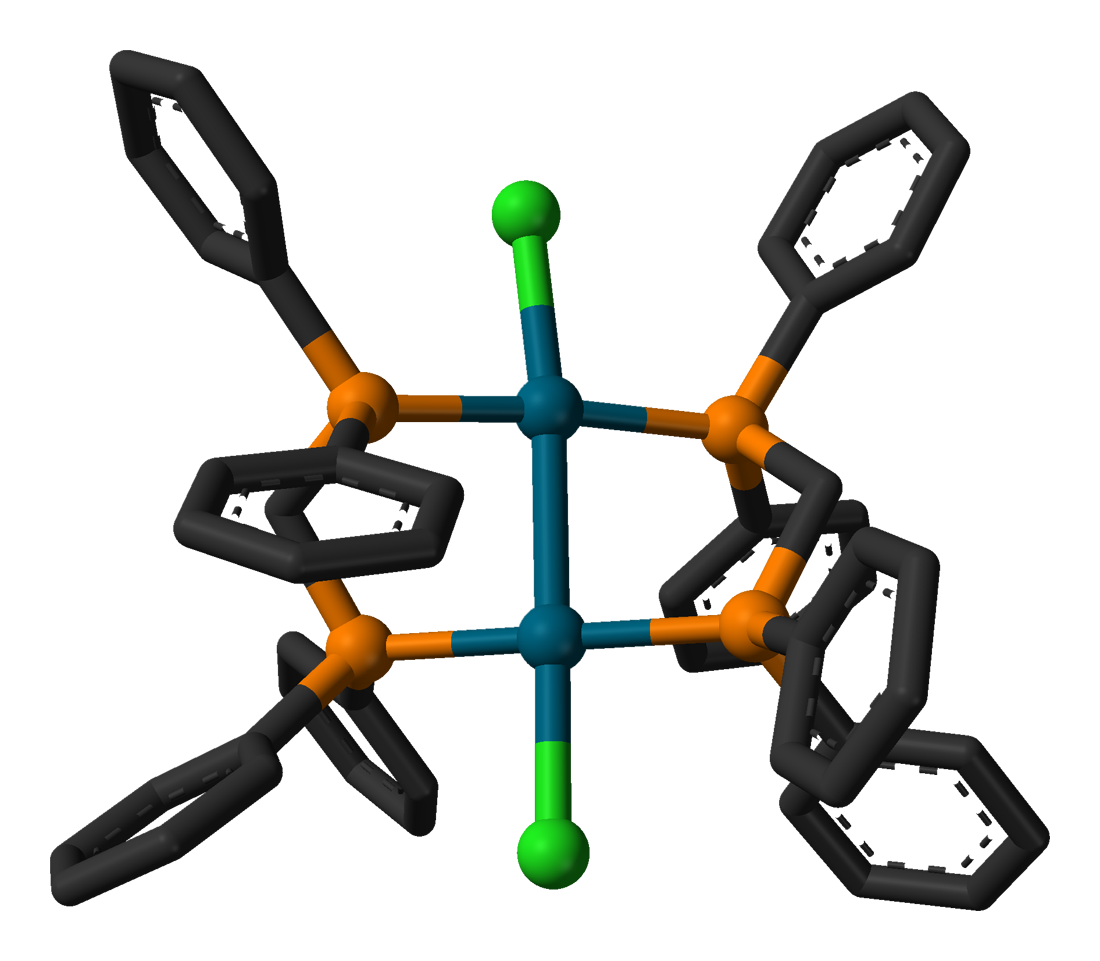
Ball-and-stick model of [Pd_{2}Cl_{2}(dppm)_{2}].
