= Azaborine =

Class of main-group heterocycle

Azaborines are a unique class of aromatic boron and nitrogen containing heterocycles isoelectronic and isostructural to carbon-containing aromatic compounds such as benzene. These novel compounds possess unique electronic characteristics that provide them unprecedented and adaptable reactivity and photophysical properties. Their properties enable them to greatly alter molecular reactivity without impacting molecular structure which makes them useful to biochemical, pharmaceutical, and catalytic applications. Several classes of isomers have been synthesized with varying stabilities and electronic properties: monocyclic 1,2-, 1,3-, and 1,4-azaborine compounds have been reported. Azaborines were first reported in the late 1950s by Dewar and White, but more recent advances have enabled the synthesis, characterization, and functionalization of these benzene isosteres. The synthesis and study of these molecules has helped further understanding of aromaticity and carbon heteroatom bonding and created novel opportunities in a variety of chemical fields.

== Development and synthesis ==
=== Development ===
Dewar, and later White, first reported polycyclic boron and nitrogen containing analogs of phenanthrene in 1958. The attempted synthesis of this compound resulted from the observation of Dewar, Kubba, and Pettit that replacement of one carbon atom of benzene with nitrogen yielded a cationic arene and that there no such single-atom replacement of carbon for boron, which should yield an anionic arene. Thus, they predicted that a benzene derivative featuring boron and nitrogen would yield a neutral aromatic compound. Interest in synthesizing new examples of compounds displaying Hückel aromaticity and novel boron-containing aromatic compounds drove investigations into these compounds. Their report of the synthesis and characterization of a polycyclic boron and nitrogen containing heteroarene shown in Figure 1 predicted the synthesis of 1,2-, 1,3- and 1,4-azaborines shown in Figure 2.

Figure 1: The polycyclic boron and nitrogen containing heteroarene, 9-Aza-10-boraphenanthrene, reported by Dewar, Kubba and Pettit in 1958

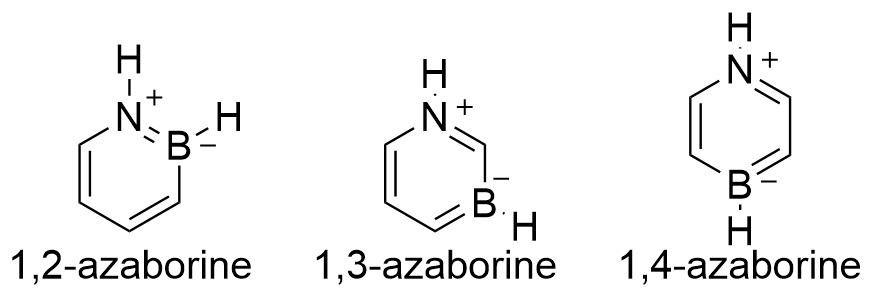
Figure 2: Three isomers of azaborines predicted by Dewar, Kubba and Pettit in 1958

Monocyclic azaborines were reported shortly after their polycyclic relatives. Marr and Dewar reported the synthesis of a monocyclic 1,2-azaborine (Figure 3) in 1962 that displayed significant stability, which they interpreted as evidence for aromatic character.

Figure 3: Borazarene reported by Dewar and Marr in 1962

In 1963, White reported the synthesis of a less substituted 1,2-azaborine (Figure 4). Although prepared in a separate manner compared to previously reported examples, White's azaborine was also classified as aromatic due to its inertness.

Figure 4: White's 1,2-azaborine reported in 1963

Numerous examples of polycyclic and monocyclic 1,2 azaborines were reported shortly after these key papers However, functionalization of the moiety and development of the other isomers stalled until the early 21st century due to the few viable synthetic methods. The advent of a ring closing metathesis strategy in 2000 enabled the field to flourish again.

The synthesis of the 1,3- and 1,4-azaborine's predicted in Dewar's initial paper was not realized until the early 2010s. In 2011, Liu and coworkers reported the novel synthesis of a monocyclic 1,3-azaborine, 3-(diisopropylamino)-1-methyl-1,3-azaborine Figure 5. Theoretical studies of the three monocyclic azaborine isomers describe 1,3-azaborine as the least thermodynamically stable of the three. Shortly afterward in 2012, Braunschweig and coworkers reported the synthesis of a monocyclic 1,4-azaborine, 1,4-di-tert-butyl-1,4-azaborine.

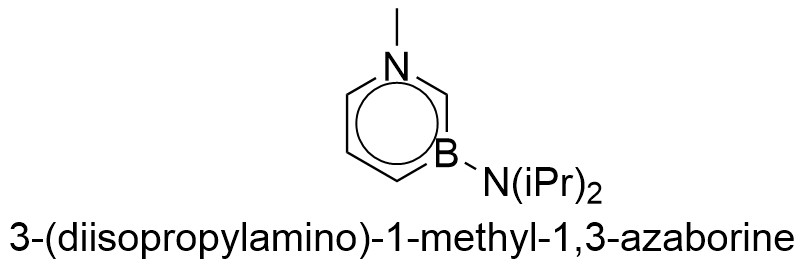
Figure 5: The 1,3-Azaborine reported by Liu and coworkers

=== Synthesis and functionalization ===
The syntheses of each isomer differ greatly in strategy and variety. The chemical procedures for synthesizing various 1,2-azaborines are more established than the syntheses of 1,3- and 1,4-azaborines due to their earlier discovery and greater stability.

==== 1,2-Azaborines ====
===== Synthesis of 1,2-azaborines =====
In 1962, Dewar and Marr reported the first synthesis of a monocyclic azaborine. They reported the synthesis of 2,3-diphenyl-6-(2-carbomethoxy-ethyl) -2,1-azaborine via the reduction of methyl 2-styryl-3-nitrothiophene-5-carboxylate using tin and hydrochloric acid. The product of this step is then condensed with phenyl dichlorobornite yielding 2-carbomethoxy-5,6-diphenyl-5,4-borazarothiophene. Treatment with Raney nickel yields the desired monocyclic 1,2-azaborine shown in Figure 3.

Since the first synthesis, more modern methods have become common place. In 2000, Ashe and coworkers reported the synthesis of 1,2-azaborines via a ring-closing metathesis of allyl aminoboranes using Grubbs catalyst (Figure 6). The synthesis reliably provided a high yield of the 1,2-azaborine. The synthesis started with allyltributyl tin and the addition of boron trichloride to introduce the boron moiety. The product of this reaction was reacted with ethylallylamine and Grubbs catalyst was used to close the ring and produce the product with an 86% yield.

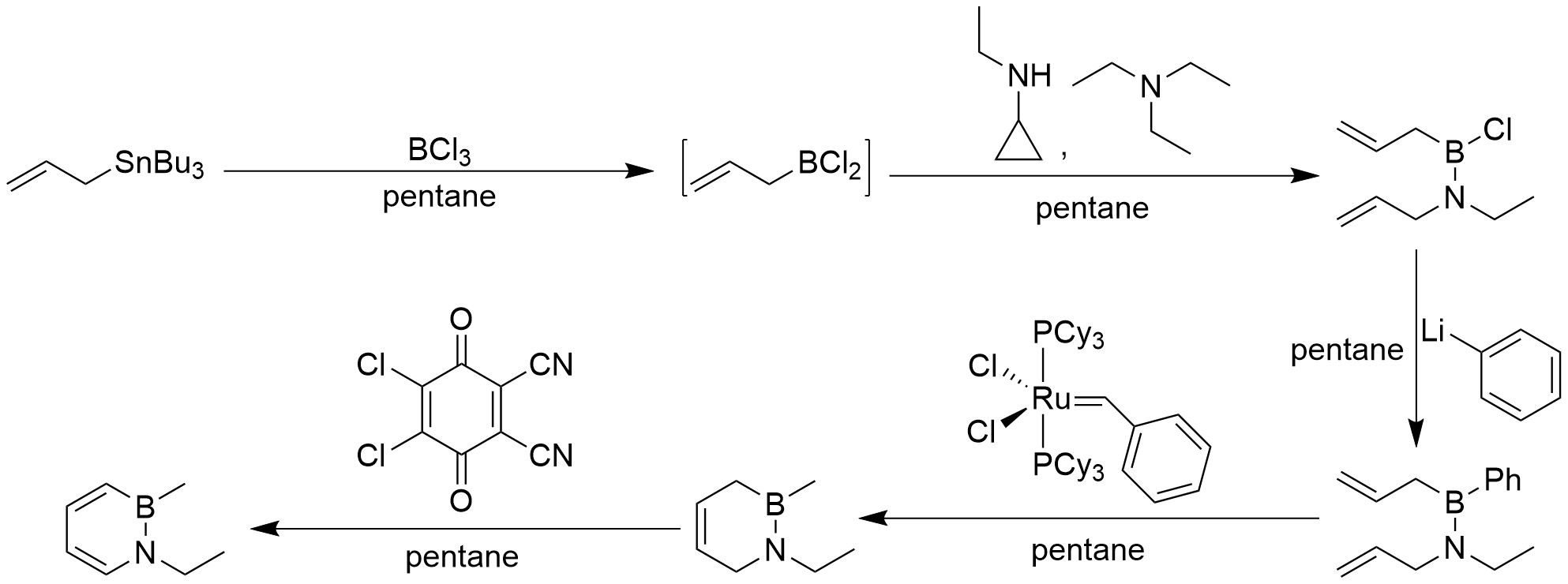
Figure 6: Ashe and coworkers synthesis of 1,2-azaborine

Additionally, Ashe and coworkers reported the synthesis of 1,2-azaborine through a carbenoid ring expansion of 1,2-azaborolide to yield the 1,2-azaborine (Figure 7). This procedure enabled the synthesis of aryl and alkyl substituted 1,2-azaborines.

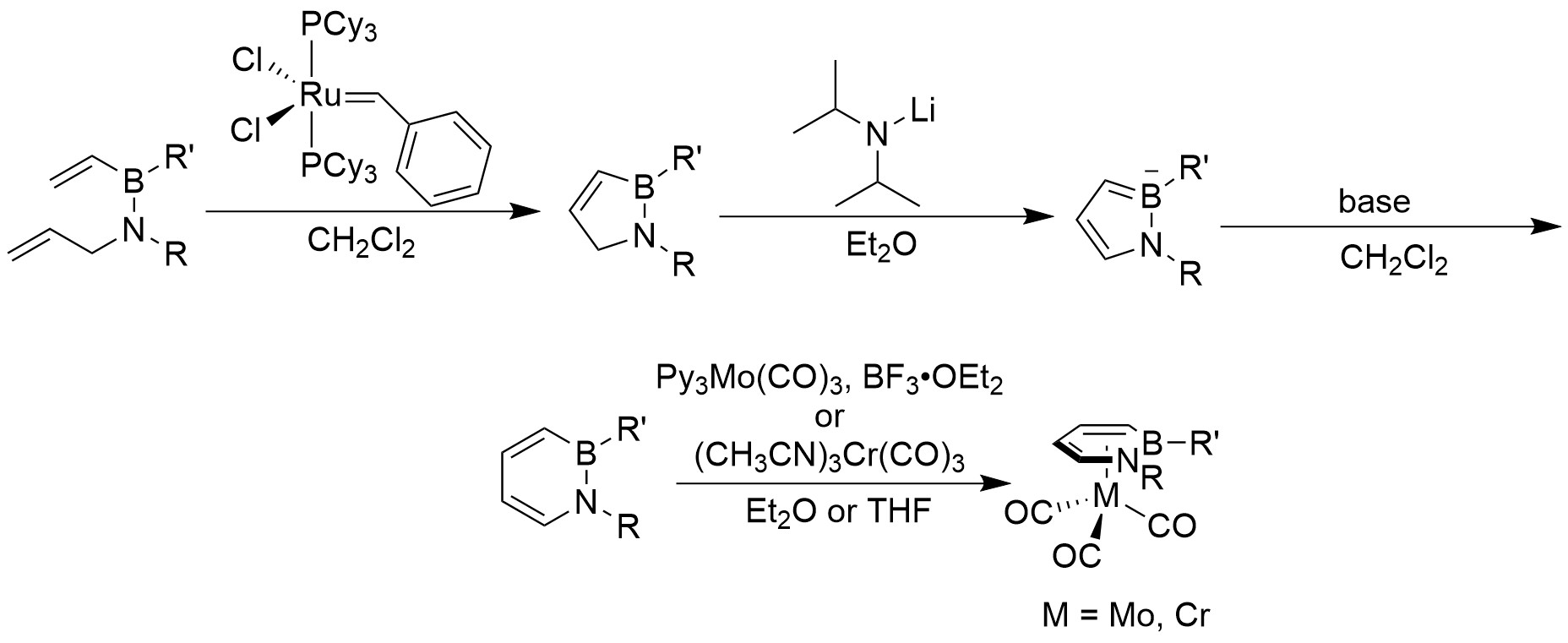
Figure 7: Ring expansion procedure for 1,2-azaborine synthesis reported by Ashe and coworkers

In 2006, Liu and coworkers reported the synthesis of 1,2-dihydro-1,2-azaborine, a valuable building block in furthering azaborine chemistry. This procedure built off of previously reported syntheses 1,2-azaborines that were functionalizable at the heteroatoms. Liu's protecting group free synthesis utilized a molybdenum catalyst to perform the ring closing metathesis and uses an allyl amine as the leaving group to be replaced by n-butanol. Subsequently, the parent 1,2-dihydro-azaborine results from the reduction of boron with lithium aluminum hydride and an acidic workup.

===== Functionalization of 1,2-azaborines =====
In 2006 Ashe and coworkers reported that a 1,2-dihydro-1,2-azaborine underwent electrophilic aromatic substitution at the 3 and 5 positions. This reactivity displayed in Figure 8 validated its analogous relationship to benzene and established that typical aromatic reactivities may be used to develop novel methods of functionalization for these compounds. Their report demonstrated electrophilic aromatic substitution with several functionalities and produced 1,2-azaborine compounds displayed in Figure 9 and substituted with deuterium, nitrile, bromine, and hydroxyl. Additionally, competition experiments demonstrated that 1-ethyl-1,2-dihydro-2-phenyl-1,2-azaborine is a highly nucleophilic aromatic compound compared to 2-methylfuran, furan, and thiophene. Substitution at the boron atom has been similarly documented and thought to proceed through an associative mechanism.

In 2024, Nature Chemistry published an article detailing synthetic methods that opened up novel space for the functionalization of 1,2-azaborines via a benzannulation. The reported synthesis enables the development of multifunctionalized monocyclic 1,2-azaborines. To demonstrate the widespread utility of the procedure, the authors reported the synthesis of a boron-nitrogen containing isostere of a PD-1/PD-L1 inhibitor, an important class of molecules for cancer treatments.

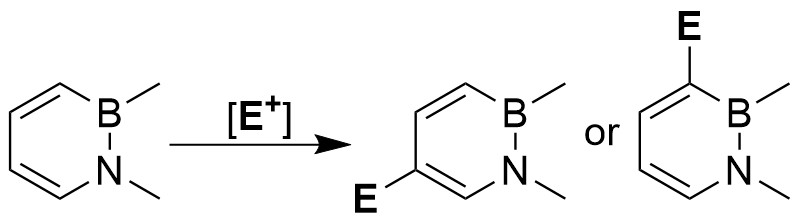
Figure 8: General electrophilic aromatic substitution of 1,2-azaborines

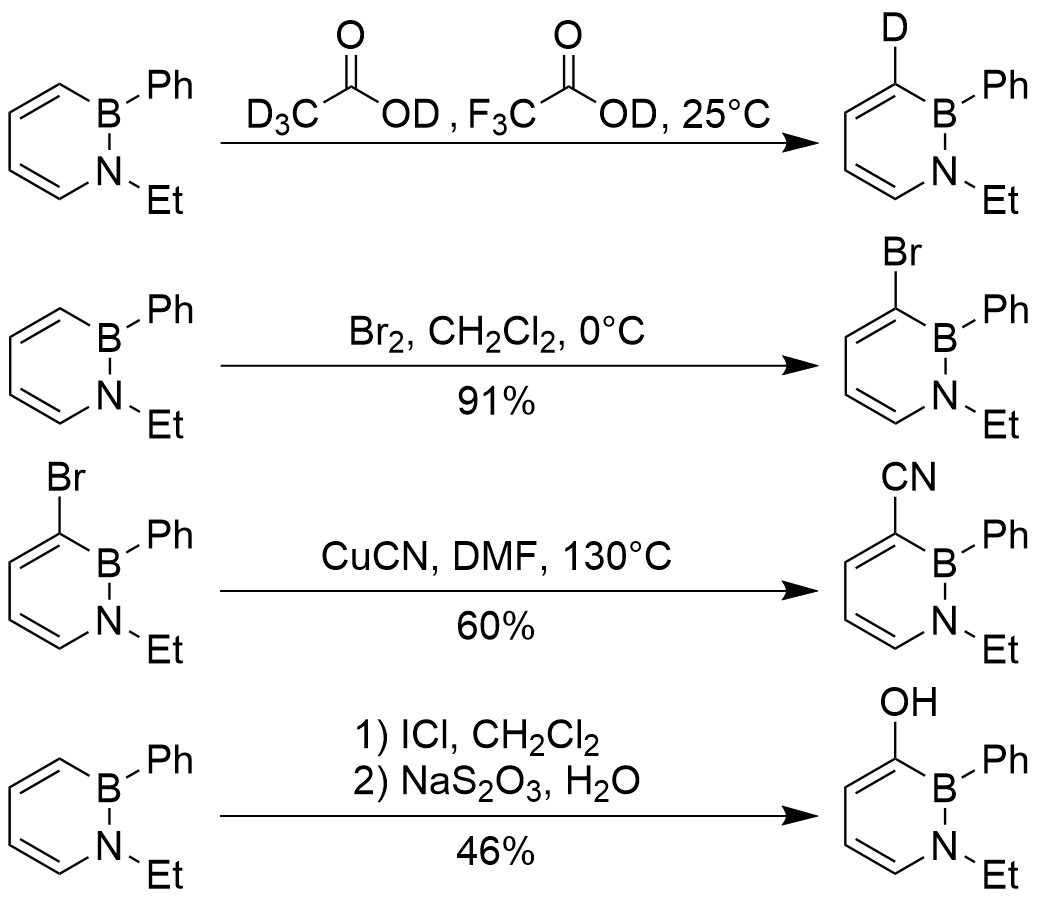
Figure 9: Electrophilic substitution reactions reported by Ashe and coworkers

==== 1,3-Azaborines ====
===== Synthesis of 1,3-azaborines =====
In 2011, Liu and coworkers completed the long sought-after synthesis of 1,3-azaborine with their procedure for the synthesis of 3-(diisopropylamino)-1-methyl-1,3-azaborine. Figure 10 demonstrates that the procedure utilizes a ring closing metathesis performed by a Grubbs catalyst. The last step of the synthesis requires a dehydrogenation. At the time, Liu noted that there were no published observations of aromatization by the removal of two meta hydrogen atoms. As the dehydrogenation produces both the hydrogenated and dehydrogenated product in varying rations, accomplishing this novel step required significant optimization of the catalyst identity and loading, solvent, and temperature to maximize the yield and ratio of dehydrogenated product to hydrogenated product (Figure 11). Liu and coworkers reported their product was isolated by distillation as a pale yellow liquid in 25% yield.

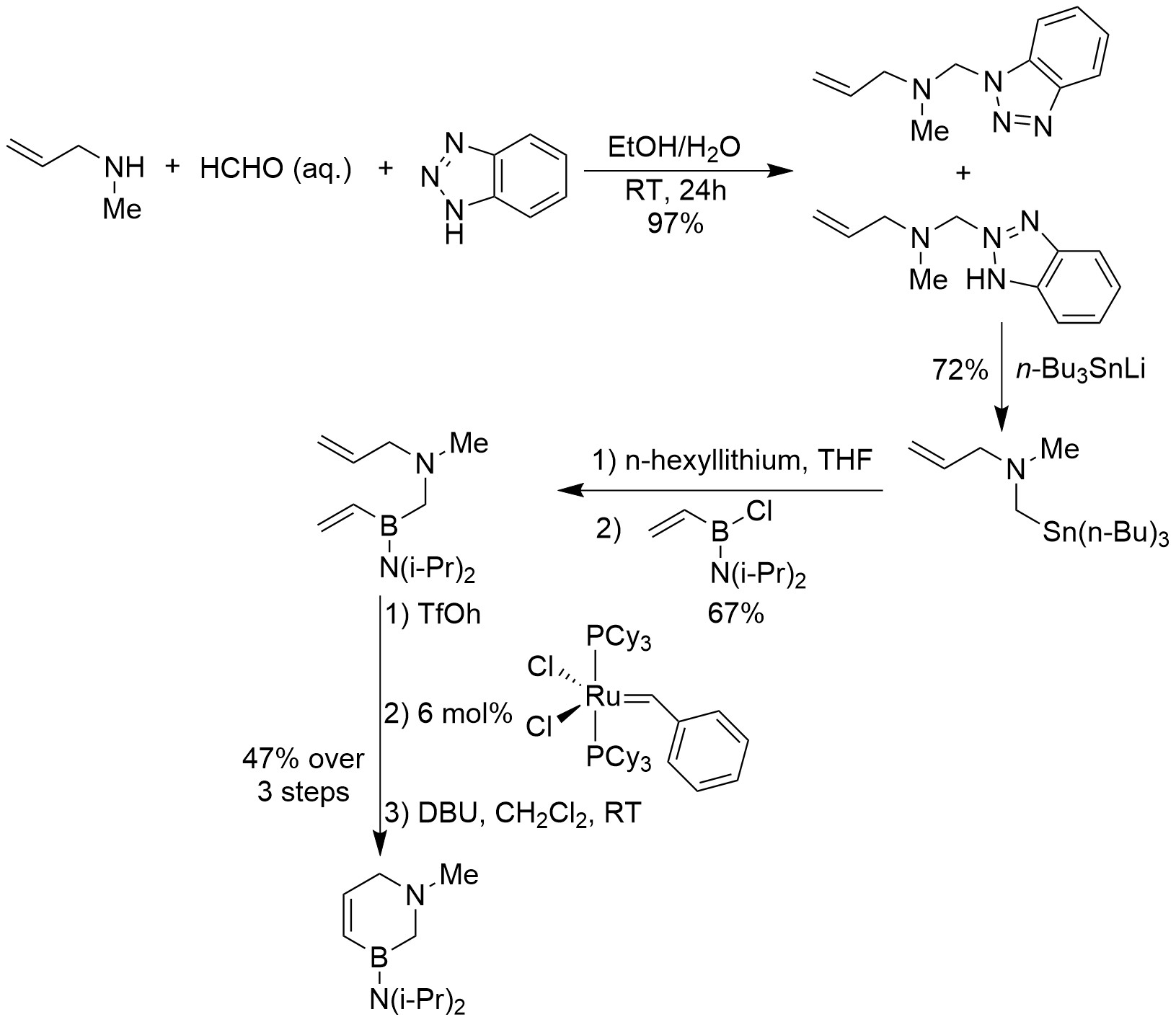
Figure 10: Synthesis of precursor for 1,3-azaborine

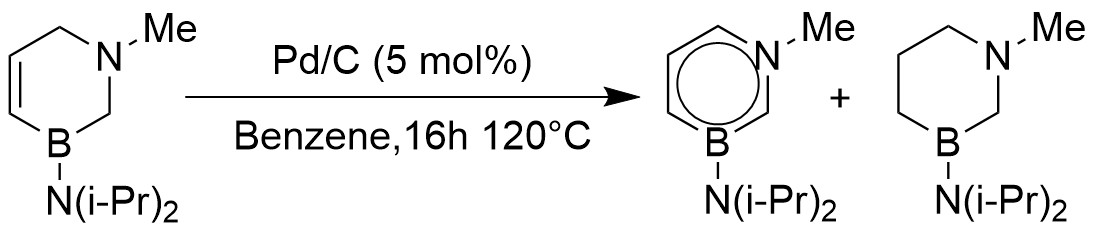
Figure 11: Final step of 1,3-azaborine synthesis produces target product and reduced side product

===== Functionalization of 1,3-azaborines =====
The functionalization of 1,3-azaborines has been reported at the boron and nitrogen positions (Figure 12) as well as on the carbon backbone, With their report of the first 1,3-azaborine in 2011, Liu and coworkers recorded the electrophilic aromatic substitution of 1,3-azaborines with Böhme's salt to yield a 1,3-azaborine substituted meta to the nitrogen at the six position of the aromatic heterocycle. The substitution occurs in mild conditions and high yield to produce the highly substituted azaborine product. Additionally, published procedures enable functionalization at boron. The starting precursor 1,3-azaborine is relatively resistant to substitution at the boron position, but can be readily functionalized in an acidic environment. After the first synthesis 1,3-azaborine, later publications detail procedures for the inclusion of chloro, cyano, fluoro and hydroxy groups at boron to take advantage of the azaborine's reactivity in an acidic environment to yield a diverse set of products.

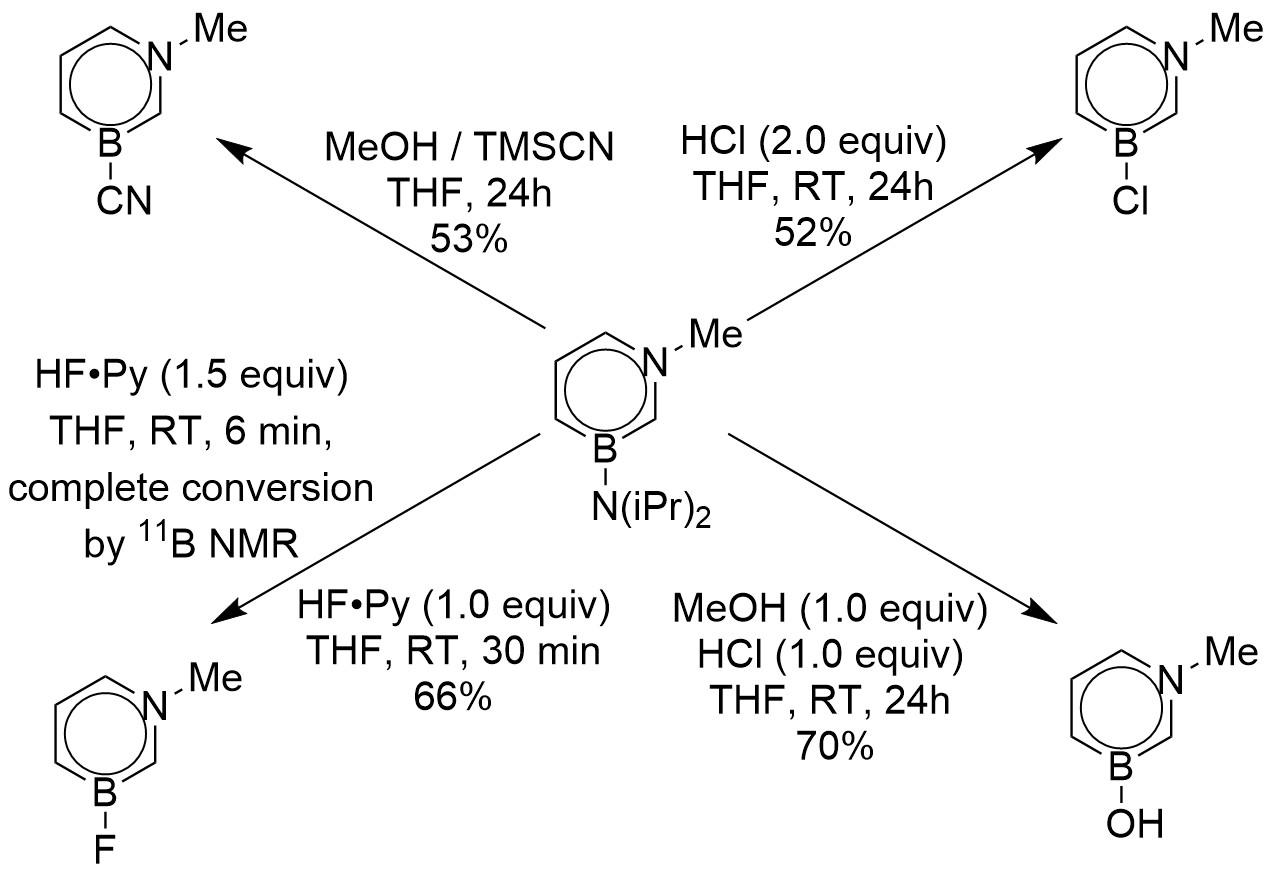
Figure 12: Substitution at boron in 1,3-azaborines reported by Liu and coworkers [Py = pyridine, TMS = trimethylsilyl]

Just as the lewis basic nitrogen can undergo electrophilic substitution, the boron of 1,3-azaborines can undergo nucleophilic substitution due to its lewis acidity and empty p orbital. The general strategy takes advantage of the acidic substitution conditions to provide a better leaving group for a nucleophilic attack at the boron atom. Figure 13 demonstrates a procedure which enables the synthesis of alkyl substituted boron atoms in 1,3-azaborines via pivalic acid and n-butyllithium in tetrahydrofuran(THF).

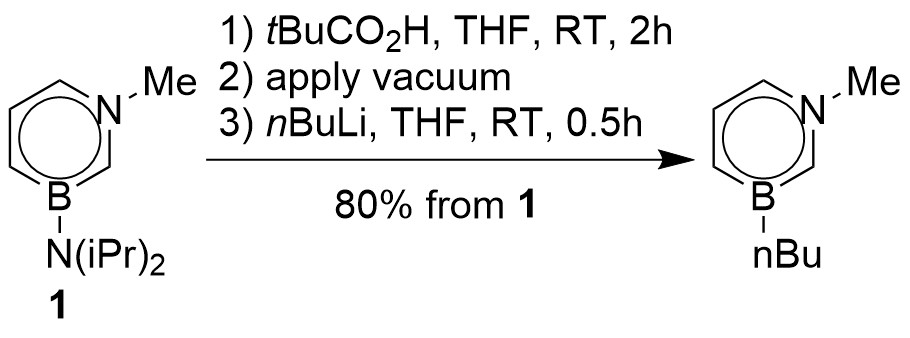
Figure 13: Nucleophilic substitution at boron in 1,3-azaborine

==== 1,4-Azaborines ====
===== Synthesis of 1,4-azaborines =====
Shortly after the report of the synthesis of 1,3-azaborine, Braunschweig and coworkers completed the synthesis of a 1,4-azaborine (Figure 14). The synthesis of this novel monocyclic 1,4-azaborine did not utilize a ring closing metathesis like many of the other syntheses did. Instead, utilized a [2+2+2] cycloaddition between di-tert-butyl-iminoborane and acetylene facilitated by a rhodium catalyst. This reaction surprisingly broke the triple bond between boron and nitrogen to form the 1,4-di-tert-butyl-1,4-azaborine.

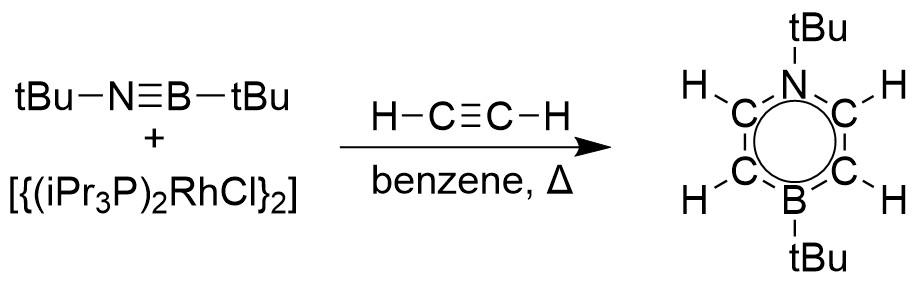
Figure 14: Rhodium catalyzed synthesis of 1,4-azaborine reported by Braunschweig and coworkers

== Structure and bonding ==
Boron and nitrogen containing heterocycles are isostructural and isoelectronic to all-carbon aromatic compounds. Both early and recent reports characterize the molecules as aromatic as they feature six π electrons. Despite the heteroatoms present in the system, azaborines obey Hückel's Rule because nitrogen contributes two π electrons and boron does not contribute any π electrons but maintains the cyclic array of p orbitals with its empty p_{z} orbital. In contrast to pyridine, nitrogen in azaborines donate two electrons to the pi system. Similar to the parent all-carbon compounds, azaborines feature planar calculated structures.

1,2-azaborines feature a boron-nitrogen bond with boron ortho to the nitrogen, where 1,3- and 1,4-azaborines do not. The boron has a meta and para relationship to the nitrogen for 1,3- and 1,4- azaborines, respectively. The relationship between the heteroatoms in each isomer are depicted in Figure 2. For 1,2-azaborines, the interaction between adjacent atoms gives the boron-nitrogen bond π character and could be depicted as a double bond. A boron-nitrogen double bond would be formally zwitterionic and thus a significantly polarized bond, but as described in Figure 15, the flow of electrons from the boron to the nitrogen in σ symmetry opposes the flow of electrons from the nitrogen lone pair to the empty p orbital of boron in π symmetry. The observation and rationalization of relatively nonpolarized boron-nitrogen bonds possessing double bond character contributes to reports that these compounds are aromatic in nature and share electrons across all six atoms in the ring.

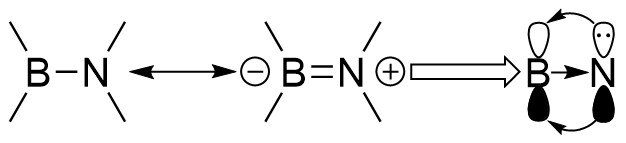
Figure 15: Alternative depictions and flow of electrons between orbitals

Although 1,3- and 1,4-azaborines do not have a lone pair adjacent to an empty p orbital to facilitate this π interaction, they still retain their aromatic character. For 1,3-azaborines, the structure is planar and the bonds lengths sit between those of single and double bonds. Initial theoretical studies of 1,3-azaborine reported structural characteristics that were less aromatic than benzene but possessed significant delocalization of π electrons. The synthesis of this elusive azaborine isomer and subsequent crystal structure provided empirical evidence of electron delocalization in 1,3-azaborines as they displayed intra-ring bonds shorter than the expected single bond length, but longer than the expected length of the respective double bonds. Theoretical studies comparing the three isomers of azaborines found that the charge separation present in 1,3-azaborines resulting from the 1,3-arrangement of the heteroatoms enhances the delocalization of electrons in the ring. As a result, researchers have labeled 1,3-azaborines as the most aromatic of the three isomers as calculated by density functional theory calculated metrics such as harmonic oscillator model of aromaticity, extracyclic resonance energy, aromatic fluctuation index, nuclear independent chemical shift, and para-delocalization index.

In 1,4-azaborines, ab initio calculations reported significant π electron delocalization around the ring, but that the conjugated π system was interrupted by the boron atom. Upon the synthesis of a 1,4-di-tert-butyl-1,4-azaborine by Braunschweig and coworkers in 2012, X-ray crystal structures revealed a planar structure similar to other isomers. Braunschweig and coworkers performed DFT calculations that yielded geometric optimizations in good agreement with their structural data. Their DFT investigation of the electronic structure of 1,4-di-tert-butyl-1,4-azaborine supported classifying the molecule as aromatic. However, this aromaticity has the caveat that the 1,4-arrangement of boron and nitrogen causes a directionality to the delocalization moving from nitrogen to boron.

Although the three isomers of azaborines possess some similar characteristic, the relative thermodynamic stabilities of these molecules is commonly referenced and investigated. Theoretical studies describe the stability of azaborine isomers as 1,2-azaborine >> 1,4-azaborine > 1,3-azaborine. However, with regard to aromaticity, 1,3-azaborines are reported to be the most aromatic and there is disagreement on the difference in aromaticity between 1,2- and 1,4-azaborines. As the aromaticity and stabilities of the molecules do not correspond, researchers have rationalized the difference in stability to be a result of the localized σ and π bond strength. The C=C double bonds and B=N double bonds are particularly strong and play a large role in stability of the molecule. According to DFT investigations using measurements such as isomerization energy decomposition analysis (IEDA), 1,2-azaborine is the most stable isomer. The stability of 1,2-azaborine results from sigma bond network as it features two C=C double bonds and a B=N double bond. In contrast, neither the 1,3- nor the 1,4-azaborine possess a B=N bond, and the two isomers possess one and two C=C double bonds, respectively. Despite their similar electronic features, the connectivity of these molecules plays a large role in their stability. Figure 16 displays the calculated bond lengths for each of the three isomers as well as the calculated thermodynamic stability using IEDA.

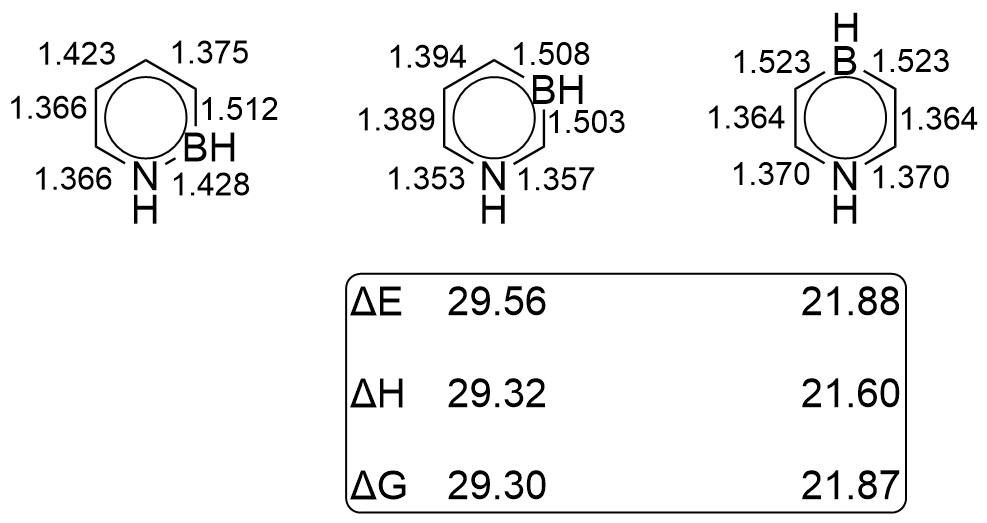
Figure 16: Calculated bond lengths (A) and energy (ΔE), enthalpy (ΔH) and Gibbs Free Energy (ΔG) relative to 1,2-azaborine in kcal/mol

== Properties and function ==
The completed syntheses of the three isomers of azaborine facilitated greater understanding of the properties and function of azaborines. In concert with their synthetic investigations, Liu and coworkers engaged in computation and spectroscopic analyses of azaborines. Utilizing UV-photoelectron spectroscopy and DFT calculations to investigate 1,2- and 1,3-azaborines electronic structure, they found that 1,2-azaborines and 1,3-azaborines possess higher highest occupied molecular orbital (HOMO) energies compared to benzene and toluene. Additionally, they feature lower energy lowest unoccupied molecular orbital (LUMO) energies as well. This combination of electronic characteristics gives the investigated azaborines very small HOMO-LUMO gaps. This corresponds to the decrease in the energy of absorbed photons as measured by UV-Vis spectroscopy.

These interesting electronic features point to broad applications elsewhere, particularly as ligands for catalysis in organic synthesis. In 2016, the Liu Group reported an example of a 1,4-azaborine containing phosphine ligand with catalytic activity that differed from the all-carbon analogue. They observed that the addition of a 1,4-azaborine moiety into a phosphine ligand resulted in a unique trans-selective hydroboration of terminal and internal 1,3 enynes with high efficiency and diastereoselectivity. An x-ray crystal structure revealed the coordinating interactions shown in Figure 17. The heteroatoms of the azaborine are uniquely capable of coordinating to group 10 metals such as platinum or palladium in a manner than is not possible for all carbon-phosphine ligands. This discovery indicates a few ways in which azaborine moieties significantly impact catalysis.

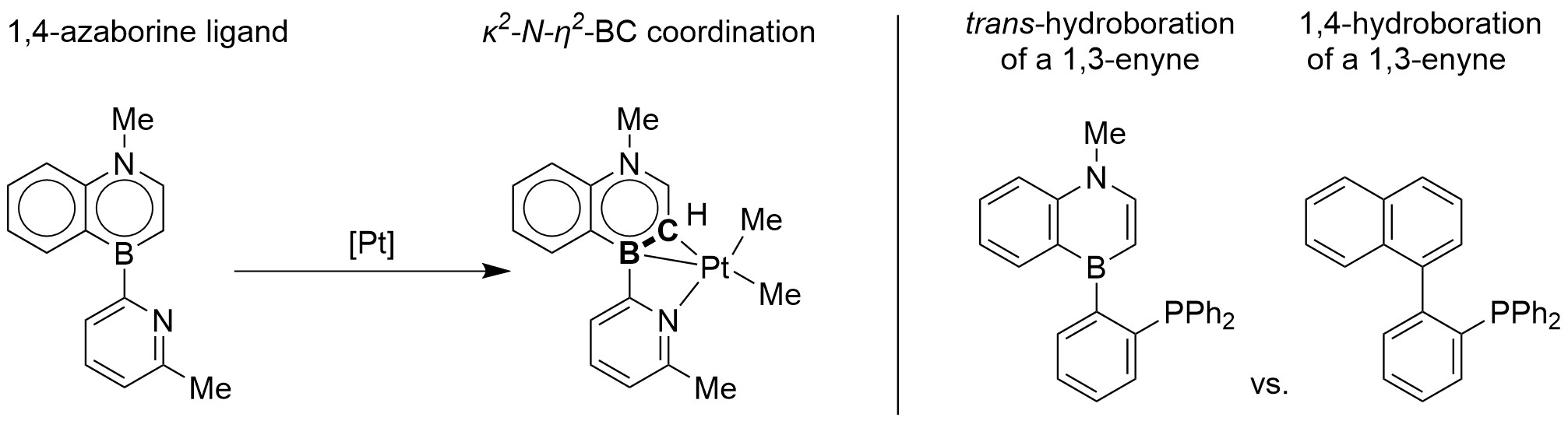
Figure 17: An example of a 1,4-azaborine containing phosphine ligand with differing catalytic activity compared to the all-carbon analog

To further investigate the effect of azaborines on coordination chemistry and potentially catalysis, Liu and coworkers published a comparative study in 2017 between azaborine containing phosphines and traditional phosphine ligands. Their investigation found that 1,2-azaborine containing phosphine pictured in Figure 18 was a significantly stronger electron donor than the traditional phosphine ligands it was compared to without having a significantly different steric profile. The 1,2-azaborine containing phosphine exhibited a 2012 cm^{−1} CO stretching frequency when coordinated to an octahedral molybdenum compound. For comparison, the comparative all-carbon analog has a CO stretching frequency of 2019 cm^{−1} and triethyl phosphine, considered a very strong donor phosphine, possess a CO stretching frequency of 2016 cm^{−1}. These measurements label the 1,2-azaborine containing phosphine as a stronger donor than both all-carbon phosphines, while retaining the steric profile of a weaker traditional phosphine.

Figure 18: 1,2-azaborine containing phosphine displaying greater electron donating capability compared to traditional phosphine ligands

The unique electronic structure and familiar steric profile of azaborines also makes them attractive candidates for biomedical applications and the development of new therapies. In 2017, Liu and coworkers completed the synthesis of a derivative of felbinac, a precursor of a known CDK2 inhibitor, containing a 1,2-azaborine replacement for the benzene ring of an active drug. They found that the 1,2-azaborine improved biological activity and oral bioavailability.
