= Electron-withdrawing group =

Class of chemical substituents

An electron-withdrawing group (EWG) is a group or atom that has the ability to draw electron density toward itself and away from other adjacent atoms. This electron density transfer is often achieved by resonance or inductive effects. Electron-withdrawing groups have significant impacts on fundamental chemical processes such as acid-base reactions, redox potentials, and substitution reactions.

== Consequences of EWGs ==
=== Effects on Brønsted–Lowry acidity ===
Electron-withdrawing groups exert an "inductive" or "electron-pulling" effect on covalent bonds. The strength of the electron-withdrawing group is inversely proportional to the pKa of the carboxylic acid.

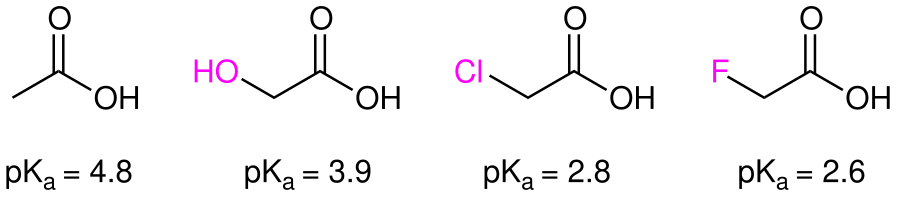

The inductive effect is cumulative: trichloroacetic acid is 1000× stronger than chloroacetic acid.

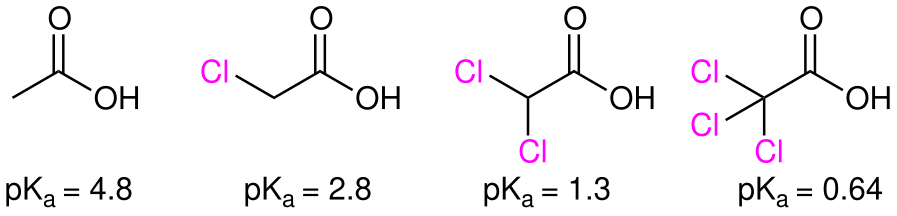

The impact of the EWG on pKa decreases with distances from the carboxylic group.

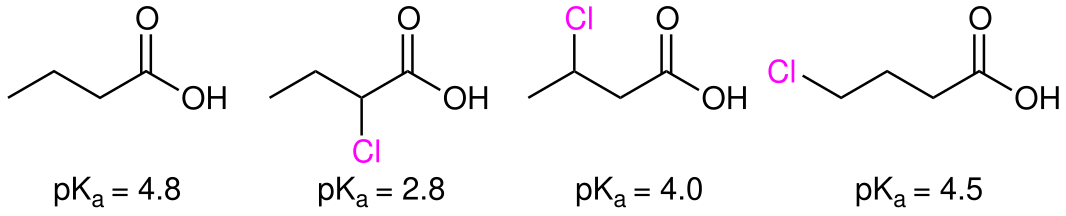

For benzoic acids, the effect is quantified by the Hammett equation:

$$\log \frac{K}{K_0} = \sigma\rho$$

where

${K}_0$ = Reference constant
$\sigma$ = Substituent constant
$\rho$ = Reaction rate constant

=== Effect on Lewis acidity ===
Electron-withdrawing groups tend to lower Lewis basicity. EWGs enhance the Lewis acidity, making compounds more reactive as Lewis acids. For example, fluorine is a stronger electron-withdrawing substituent than methyl, resulting in an increased Lewis acidity of boron trifluoride relative to trimethylborane.

This effect of EWG has been quantified in many of ways. The Tolman electronic parameter is determined by the frequency of a C-O vibrational mode (ν(CO)) of the coordination complexes [LNi(CO)_{3}] (L = Lewis base).

TEP for selected phosphines
| L | ν(CO) cm^{−1} |
|---|---|
| P(t-Bu)_{3} | 2056.1 |
| P(NMe_{2})_{3} | 2061.9 |
| PMe_{3} | 2064.1 |
| P(C_{6}H_{4}OMe)_{3} | 2066 |
| PPh_{3} | 2068.9 |
| P(C_{6}H_{4}F)_{3} | 2071.3 |
| P(OEt)_{3} | 2076.3 |
| PCl_{3} | 2097.0 |
| PF_{3} | 2110.8 |

=== Effect on a aromatic substitution reactions ===
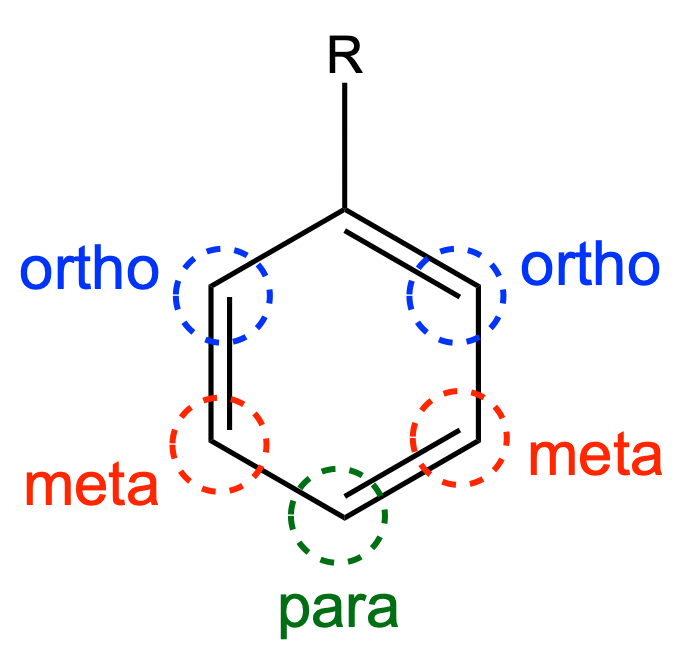

Electrophilic aromatic substitution is famously affected by EWGs. The effect is transmitted by inductive and resonance effects. Benzene with an EWG typically undergoes electrophilic substitution at meta positions. Overall the rates are diminished. thus EWGs are called deactivating.

When it comes to nucleophilic substitution reactions, electron-withdrawing groups are more prone to nucleophilic substitution. For example, chlorodinitrobenzene is far more susceptible to reactions displacing chloride compared to chlorobenzene.

=== Effects on redox potential ===
In the context of electron transfer, these groups enhance the oxidizing power tendency of the attached species. For example, tetracyanoethylene serves as an oxidant due to its four cyano substituents, which are electron-withdrawing.

Oxidants with EWGs are stronger than the parent compound. Acetylferrocenium is 300 mV more oxidizing than ferrocene.

== Comparison with electron-donating groups ==
Electron-withdrawing groups are the opposite effect of electron-donating groups (EDGs). Both describe functional groups, however, electron-withdrawing groups pull electron density away from a molecule, whereas EDGs push electron density onto a substituent.

== See also ==
- Electron-donating group
