= Tolman =

The surname Tolman may refer to:

- Aiden Tolman (born 1988), Australian Rugby League player
- Andrew Tolman (born 1986), American drummer and co-founder of alternative rock groups Imagine Dragons and The Moth & The Flame
- Brett Tolman (born 1970), United States Attorney involved in Patriot Act reauthorization and controversy over dismissal of U.S. attorneys
- Chadwick A. Tolman (born 1938), 1970s duPont research chemist after whom the Tolman cone angle and Tolman electronic parameter are named
- Charles E. Tolman (1903–1943), posthumous US Navy Cross recipient after whom USS Tolman was named
- Edgar Bronson Tolman (1859–1947), president of Illinois State Bar Association and editor-in-chief of American Bar Association Journal
- Edward C. Tolman (1886–1959), American psychologist
- George R. Tolman (1848–c. 1930), American architect and illustrator
- James E. Tolman (1867–1956), Massachusetts lawyer and state representative
- Marije Tolman (born 1976), Dutch illustrator of children's literature
- Richard C. Tolman (1881–1948), American mathematical physicist and physical chemist
- Russ Tolman (born 1956), American guitarist, co-founder of Paisley Underground band True West
- Steven Tolman (born 1952), president of the Massachusetts AFL–CIO and former state senator
- Susan Tolman, American mathematician
- Teun Tolman (1924–2007), Dutch politician
- Tim Tolman (1956–2021), Major League Baseball outfielder
- Warren Tolman (born 1959), former Massachusetts senator and state representative
- Warren W. Tolman (1861–1940), justice of the Washington Supreme Court

== See also ==
- Tollman
