= Toliman (disambiguation) =

Toliman or Tolimán may refer to:

- The star Alpha Centauri B.
- Tolimán (Jalisco), a town in the Mexican state of Jalisco.
- Tolimán (Querétaro), a town in the Mexican state of Querétaro.
- Tolimán (volcano), a stratovolcano in Guatemala.
- TOLIMAN, a telescope

== See also ==
- Tolima (disambiguation)
- Tolman
