= Aminophosphine =

In organophosphorus chemistry, aminophosphines are compounds with the formula R_{3−n}P(NR_{2})_{n} where R is a hydrogen or organic substituent, and n = 0, 1, or 2. At one extreme, the parents H_{2}PNH_{2} and P(NH_{2})_{3} are lightly studied and fragile. At the other extreme, tris(dimethylamino)phosphine (P(NMe_{2})_{3}) is commonly available. Intermediate members are known, such as Ph_{2}PN(H)Ph. Aminophosphines are typically colorless and reactive to oxygen. Aminophosphines are pyramidal geometry at phosphorus.

== Parent members ==
Structure of P(NMe_{2})_{3}.

The aminophosphine called the Verkade base is a superbase.

The fundamental aminophosphines have the formulae PH_{3−n}(NH_{2})_{n} (n = 1, 2, or 3). Fundamental aminophosphines can not be isolated in a practical quantities but have been examined theoretically. H_{2}NPH_{2} is predicted to be more stable than the P(V) tautomer HN=PH_{3}.

Secondary amines are more straightforward. Trisaminophosphines are made by treating phosphorus trichloride with secondary amines:

PCl_{3} + 6 HNMe_{2} → (Me_{2}N)_{3}P + 3 [H_{2}NMe_{2}]Cl

where Me = methyl.

== Aminophosphine chlorides ==
Structure of Me_{2}NPCl_{2}.

The amination of phosphorus trihalides occur sequentially, with each amination proceeding slower than before:

PCl_{3} + 2 HNMe_{2} → Me_{2}NPCl_{2} + [H_{2}NMe_{2}]Cl
Me_{2}NPCl_{2} + 2 HNMe_{2} → (Me_{2}N)_{2}PCl + [H_{2}NMe_{2}]Cl
(Me_{2}N)_{2}PCl + 2 HNMe_{2} → (Me_{2}N)_{3}P + [H_{2}NMe_{2}]Cl

Monosubstitution selectivity improves with bulky amines such as diisopropylamine. Commercially available aminophosphine chlorides include dimethylaminophosphorus dichloride and bis(dimethylamino)phosphorus chloride.

Methylamine and trifluorophosphine react to give MeN(PF_{2})_{2}:

2 PF_{3} + 3 MeNH_{2} → MeN(PF_{2})_{2} + 2 [MeNH_{3}]F

MeN(PF_{2})_{2} is a bridging ligand in organometallic chemistry.

Aminophosphines can also made from organophosphorus chlorides and amines. Chlorodiphenylphosphine and diethylamine react to give an aminophosphine:

Ph_{2}PCl + 2 HNEt_{2} → Ph_{2}PNEt_{2} + [H_{2}NEt_{2}]Cl

Primary amines react with phosphorus(III) chlorides to give aminophosphines with acidic α-NH centers:

Ph_{2}PCl + 2 H_{2}NR → Ph_{2}PN(H)R + [H_{3}NR]Cl

== Reactions ==
=== Protonolysis ===
Protic reagents attack the P-N bond. Alcoholysis readily occurs:

Ph_{2}PNEt_{2} + ROH → Ph_{2}POR + HNEt_{2}

The P-N bond reverts to the chloride when treated with anhydrous hydrogen chloride:

Ph_{2}PNEt_{2} + HCl → Ph_{2}PCl + HNEt_{2}

Transamination similarly converts one aminophosphine to another:

P(NMe_{2})_{3} + R_{2}NH ⇌ P(NR_{2})(NMe_{2})_{2} + HNMe_{2}

With tris(dimethylamino)phosphine, dimethylamine evaporation can drive the equilibrium.

Since Grignard reagents do not attack P-NR_{2} bond, aminophosphine chlorides are useful reagents in preparing unsymmetrical tertiary phosphines. Illustrative is converting dimethylaminophosphorus dichloride to chlorodimethylphosphine:

2 MeMgBr + Me_{2}NPCl_{2} → Me_{2}NPMe_{2} + 2 MgBrCl
Me_{2}NPMe_{2} + 2 HCl → ClPMe_{2} + Me_{2}NH_{2}Cl

Also, illustrative is the synthesis of 1,2-bis(dichlorophosphino)benzene using (Et_{2}N)_{2}PCl (Et = ethyl). This route gives C_{6}H_{4}[P(NEt_{2})_{2}]_{2}, which is treated with hydrogen chloride:

C_{6}H_{4}[P(NEt_{2})_{2}]_{2} + 8 HCl → C_{6}H_{4}(PCl_{2})_{2} + 4 Et_{2}NH_{2}Cl

=== Conversion to phosphenium salts ===
Diaminophosphorus chlorides and tris(dimethylamino)phosphine are precursors to phosphenium ions of the type [(R_{2}N)_{2}P]^{+}:

R_{2}PCl + AlCl_{3} → [R_{2}P^{+}]AlCl_{4}^{−}
P(NMe_{2})_{3} + 2 HOTf → [P(NMe_{2})_{2}]OTf + [H_{2}NMe_{2}]OTf

=== Oxidation and quaternization ===
Typical aminophosphines oxidize. Alkylation, such as by methyl iodide, gives the phosphonium cation.

=== Addition to carbonyls ===
In diazaphospholenes the polarity of the P-H bond is inverted compared to traditional secondary phosphines. They have some hydridic character. One manifestation of this polarity is their reactivity toward benzophenone in yet another way.

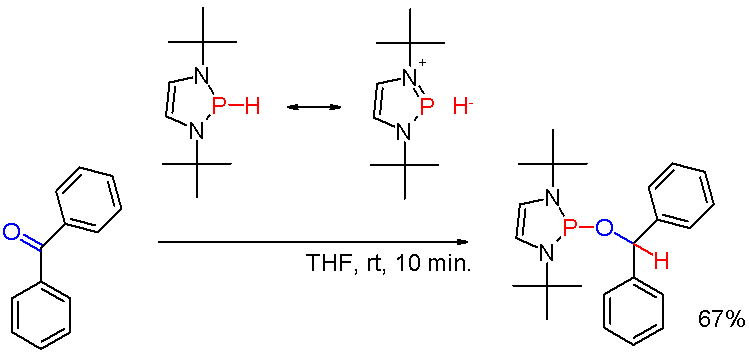
Diazaphospholene phosphine hydride
