= Verkade base =

Names
- Preferred IUPAC name 2,8,9-Trimethyl-2,5,8,9-tetraaza-1-phosphabicyclo[3.3.3]undecane

Identifiers
CAS Number	120666-13-9
3D model (JSmol)	Interactive image
ChemSpider	3397532
PubChem CID	4186723
UNII	LK9MJR52XE
CompTox Dashboard (EPA)	DTXSID90400494
- InChI: InChI=1S/C9H21N4P/c1-10-4-7-13-8-5-11(2)14(10)12(3)6-9-13/h4-9H2,1-3H3 Key: PCYSWBQHCWWSFW-UHFFFAOYSA-N
- SMILES: CN1CCN2CCN(P1N(CC2)C)C

Properties
Chemical formula	C_{9}H_{21}N_{4}P
Molar mass	216.269 g·mol^{−1}
Appearance	colorless oil
Boiling point	263.9 °C (507.0 °F; 537.0 K)
- Except where otherwise noted, data are given for materials in their standard state (at 25 °C [77 °F], 100 kPa). Infobox references

In chemistry, the Verkade base (or Verkade superbase) is a powerful superbase with the formula P(MeNCH_{2}CH_{2})_{3}N. A colorless oil, it is an aminophosphine although its inventor John Verkade called it proazaphosphatrane. The trimethyl derivative or 2,5,8,9-tetraaza-1-phosphabicyclo[3.3.3]undecane is the simplest. Diverse analogues of the Verkade base are known, e.g. with isopropyl groups in place of methyl.

== Synthesis and reactions ==
The Verkade base is generated by the reaction of N,N,N-trimethyltren with tris(dimethylamino)phosphine:

P(NMe_{2})_{3} + (MeNHCH_{2}CH_{2})_{3}N → P(MeNCH_{2}CH_{2})_{3}N + 3 Me_{2}NH

The principal reaction of the Verkade base is protonation. The proton is attacked by the Verkade base at the phosphorus atom within, which induces the formation of a transannular P-N bond. The product exemplifies the structure of an atrane.

Protonation of Verkade base.

The conjugate acid [HP(MeNCH_{2}CH_{2})_{3}N]^{+} of the base has a pK_{a} of 32.9 in acetonitrile. For comparison, the conjugate acid of triethylamine has a pK_{a} near 17 in acetonitrile. Owing to its ability to deprotonate weak carbon acids, the Verkade base catalyzes a variety of condensation reactions.

== Related compounds ==
Phosphazenes are phosphorus(V) derivatives with the formula RN=P(NR_{2})_{3}.
