= Hexamethylphosphorous triamide =

Hexamethylphosphorous triamide (HMPT) could be:

- Hexamethylphosphoramide
- Tris(dimethylamino)phosphine
