= Electron counting =

Formalism used for classifying compounds

In chemistry, electron counting is a formalism for assigning a number of valence electrons to individual atoms in a molecule. It is used for classifying compounds and for explaining or predicting their electronic structure and bonding. Many rules in chemistry rely on electron-counting:

- Octet rule is used with Lewis structures for main group elements, especially the lighter ones such as carbon, nitrogen, and oxygen,
- 18-electron rule in inorganic chemistry and organometallic chemistry of transition metals,
- Hückel's rule for the π-electrons of aromatic compounds,
- Polyhedral skeletal electron pair theory for polyhedral cluster compounds, including transition metals and main group elements and mixtures thereof, such as boranes.

Atoms are called "electron-deficient" when they have too few electrons as compared to their respective rules, or "hypervalent" when they have too many electrons. Since these compounds tend to be more reactive than compounds that obey their rule, electron counting is an important tool for identifying the reactivity of molecules. While the counting formalism considers each atom separately, these individual atoms (with their hypothetical assigned charge) do not generally exist as free species.

== Counting rules ==
Two methods of electron counting are "neutral counting" and "ionic counting". Both approaches give the same result (and can therefore be used to verify one's calculation).

- The neutral counting approach assumes the molecule or fragment being studied consists of purely covalent bonds. It was popularized by Malcolm Green along with the L and X ligand notation. It is usually considered easier especially for low-valent transition metals.
- The "ionic counting" approach assumes purely ionic bonds between atoms.

It is important, though, to be aware that most chemical species exist between the purely covalent and ionic extremes.

=== Neutral counting ===
- Neutral counting assumes each bond is equally split between two atoms.
- This method begins with locating the central atom on the periodic table and determining the number of its valence electrons. One counts valence electrons for main group elements differently from transition metals, which use d electron count.

E.g. in period 2: B, C, N, O, and F have 3, 4, 5, 6, and 7 valence electrons, respectively.
E.g. in period 4: K, Ca, Sc, Ti, V, Cr, Fe, Ni have 1, 2, 3, 4, 5, 6, 8, 10 valence electrons respectively.

- One is added for every halide or other anionic ligand which binds to the central atom through a sigma bond.
- Two is added for every lone pair bonding to the metal (e.g. each Lewis base binds with a lone pair). Unsaturated hydrocarbons such as alkenes and alkynes are considered Lewis bases. Similarly Lewis and Bronsted acids (protons) contribute nothing.
- One is added for each homoelement bond.
- One is added for each negative charge, and one is subtracted for each positive charge.

=== Ionic counting ===
- Ionic counting assumes unequal sharing of electrons in the bond. The more electronegative atom in the bond gains electron lost from the less electronegative atom.
- This method begins by calculating the number of electrons of the element, assuming an oxidation state.

E.g. for a Fe^{2+} has 6 electrons
S^{2−} has 8 electrons

- Two is added for every halide or other anionic ligand which binds to the metal through a sigma bond.
- Two is added for every lone pair bonding to the metal (e.g. each phosphine ligand can bind with a lone pair). Similarly Lewis and Bronsted acids (protons) contribute nothing.
- For unsaturated ligands such as alkenes, one electron is added for each carbon atom binding to the metal.

== Electrons donated by common fragments ==
Ligand	Electrons contributed (neutral counting)	Electrons contributed (ionic counting)	Ionic equivalent
X	1	2	X^{−}; X = F, Cl, Br, I
H	1	2	H^{−}
H	1	0	H^{+}
O	2	4	O^{2−}
N	3	6	N^{3−}
CO	2	2	CO
NR_{3}	2	2	NR_{3}; R = H, alkyl, aryl
CR_{2}	2	4	CR^{2−}_{2}
Ethylene	2	2	C_{2}H_{4}
cyclopentadienyl	5	6	C_{5}H^{−}_{5}
benzene	6	6	C_{6}H_{6}

=== "Special cases" ===
The numbers of electrons "donated" by some ligands depends on the geometry of the metal-ligand ensemble. An example of this complication is the M–NO entity. When this grouping is linear, the NO ligand is considered to be a three-electron ligand. When the M–NO subunit is strongly bent at N, the NO is treated as a pseudohalide and is thus a one electron (in the neutral counting approach). The situation is not very different from the η^{3} versus the η^{1} allyl. Another unusual ligand from the electron counting perspective is sulfur dioxide.

== Examples ==
- H_{2}O

For a water molecule (H_{2}O), using both neutral counting and ionic counting result in a total of 8 electrons.

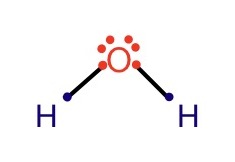
This figure of the water molecule shows how the electrons are distributed with the covalent counting method. The red ones are the oxygen electrons, and the blue ones are electrons from the hydrogen atoms.

Neutral counting
Atom	Electrons contributed	Electron count
H^{.}	1 electron × 2	2 electrons
O	6 electrons	6 electrons
		Total = 8 electrons

The neutral counting method assumes each OH bond is split equally (each atom gets one electron from the bond). Thus both hydrogen atoms have an electron count of one. The oxygen atom has 6 valence electrons. The total electron count is 8, which agrees with the octet rule.

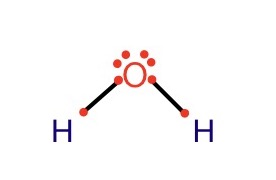
This figure of the water molecule shows how the electrons are distributed with the ionic counting method. The red ones are the oxygen electrons, and the blue ones are electrons from hydrogen. All electrons in the OH bonds belong to the more electronegative oxygen.

Ionic counting
Atom	Electrons contributed	Electron count
H^{+}	none	0 electron
O^{2−}	8 electrons	8 electrons
		Total = 8 electrons

With the ionic counting method, the more electronegative oxygen will gain electrons donated by the two hydrogen atoms in the two OH bonds to become O^{2−}. It now has 8 total valence electrons, which obeys the octet rule.

- CH_{4}, for the central C

neutral counting: C contributes 4 electrons, each H radical contributes one each: 4 + 4 × 1 = 8 valence electrons
ionic counting: C^{4−} contributes 8 electrons, each proton contributes 0 each: 8 + 4 × 0 = 8 electrons.
Similar for H:
neutral counting: H contributes 1 electron, the C contributes 1 electron (the other 3 electrons of C are for the other 3 hydrogens in the molecule): 1 + 1 × 1 = 2 valence electrons.
ionic counting: H contributes 0 electrons (H^{+}), C^{4−} contributes 2 electrons (per H), 0 + 1 × 2 = 2 valence electrons
conclusion: Methane follows the octet-rule for carbon, and the duet rule for hydrogen, and hence is expected to be a stable molecule (as we see from daily life)

- H_{2}S, for the central S

neutral counting: S contributes 6 electrons, each hydrogen radical contributes one each: 6 + 2 × 1 = 8 valence electrons
ionic counting: S^{2−} contributes 8 electrons, each proton contributes 0: 8 + 2 × 0 = 8 valence electrons
conclusion: with an octet electron count (on sulfur), we can anticipate that H_{2}S would be pseudo-tetrahedral if one considers the two lone pairs.

- SCl_{2}, for the central S

neutral counting: S contributes 6 electrons, each chlorine radical contributes one each: 6 + 2 × 1 = 8 valence electrons
ionic counting: S^{2+} contributes 4 electrons, each chloride anion contributes 2: 4 + 2 × 2 = 8 valence electrons
conclusion: see discussion for H_{2}S above. Both SCl_{2} and H_{2}S follow the octet rule - the behavior of these molecules is however quite different.

- SF_{6}, for the central S

neutral counting: S contributes 6 electrons, each fluorine radical contributes one each: 6 + 6 × 1 = 12 valence electrons
ionic counting: S^{6+} contributes 0 electrons, each fluoride anion contributes 2: 0 + 6 × 2 = 12 valence electrons
conclusion: ionic counting indicates a molecule lacking lone pairs of electrons, therefore its structure will be octahedral, as predicted by VSEPR. One might conclude that this molecule would be highly reactive - but the opposite is true: SF_{6} is inert, and it is widely used in industry because of this property.

- RuCl_{2}(bpy)_{2}

The geometry of cis-dichlorobis(bipyridine)ruthenium(II)

RuCl_{2}(bpy)_{2} is an octahedral metal complex with two bidentate 2,2′-bipyridine (bpy) ligands and two chloride ligands.

Neutral counting
Metal/ligand	Electrons contributed	Electron count
Ru(0)	d^{8} (8 d electrons)	8 electrons
bpy	4 electrons × 2	8 electrons
Cl·	1 electron × 2	2 electrons
		Total = 18 electrons

In the neutral counting method, the Ruthenium of the complex is treated as Ru(0). It has 8 d electrons to contribute to the electron count. The two bpy ligands are L-type ligand neutral ligands, thus contributing two electrons each. The two chloride ligands halides and thus 1 electron donors, donating 1 electron each to the electron count. The total electron count of RuCl_{2}(bpy)_{2} is 18.

Ionic counting
Metal/ligand	Electrons contributed	Number of electrons
Ru(II)	d^{6} (6 d electrons)	6 electrons
bpy	4 electrons × 2	8 electrons
Cl^{−}	2 electrons × 2	4 electrons
		Total = 18 electrons

In the ionic counting method, the Ruthenium of the complex is treated as Ru(II). It has 6 d electrons to contribute to the electron count. The two bpy ligands are L-type ligand neutral ligands, thus contributing two electrons each. The two chloride ligands are anionic ligands, thus donating 2 electrons each to the electron count. The total electron count of RuCl_{2}(bpy)_{2} is 18, agreeing with the result of neural counting.

- TiCl_{4}, for the central Ti

neutral counting: Ti contributes 4 electrons, each chlorine radical contributes one each: 4 + 4 × 1 = 8 valence electrons
ionic counting: Ti^{4+} contributes 0 electrons, each chloride anion contributes two each: 0 + 4 × 2 = 8 valence electrons
conclusion: Having only 8e (vs. 18 possible), we can anticipate that TiCl_{4} will be a good Lewis acid. Indeed, it reacts (in some cases violently) with water, alcohols, ethers, amines.

- Fe(CO)_{5}

neutral counting: Fe contributes 8 electrons, each CO contributes 2 each: 8 + 2 × 5 = 18 valence electrons
ionic counting: Fe(0) contributes 8 electrons, each CO contributes 2 each: 8 + 2 × 5 = 18 valence electrons
conclusions: this is a special case, where ionic counting is the same as neutral counting, all fragments being neutral. Since this is an 18-electron complex, it is expected to be isolable compound.

- Ferrocene, (C_{5}H_{5})_{2}Fe, for the central Fe:

neutral counting: Fe contributes 8 electrons, the 2 cyclopentadienyl-rings contribute 5 each: 8 + 2 × 5 = 18 electrons
ionic counting: Fe^{2+} contributes 6 electrons, the two aromatic cyclopentadienyl rings contribute 6 each: 6 + 2 × 6 = 18 valence electrons on iron.
conclusion: Ferrocene is expected to be an isolable compound.

== See also ==
- d electron count
- Tolman's rule
