= Tollman =

Tollman is a surname. Notable people with the surname include:

- Annabel Tollman (1974–2013), Belgian/British American fashion journalist
- Ricky Tollman (fl. 2014), )South African filmmaker, screenwriter, and producer

== See also ==
- Tolman
