= Danheiser annulation =

Organic chemical reaction

The Danheiser annulation or Danheiser TMS-cyclopentene annulation is an organic reaction of an α,β-unsaturated ketone and a trialkylsilylallene (e.g., trimethylsilyl- or triisopropylsilyl-) in the presence of a Lewis Acid to give a trialkylsilylcyclopentene in a regiocontrolled annulation.

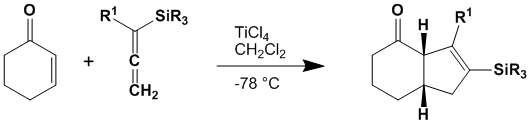
