= Atrane =

Class of chemical compounds

The atrane structure

Atranes are a class of tricyclic molecules that are fused to a common central bond. Unlike the propellanes, the central bond is a transannular dative bond from a Lewis base—typically nitrogen—at one bridgehead to a Lewis acidic atom such as silicon or boron at the other bridgehead. Each of the three rings is therefore heterocyclic. Each of the rings is typically five atoms, or sometimes six atoms. The name "atrane" was first proposed by Mikhail Grigorievich Voronkov.

== Nomenclature ==
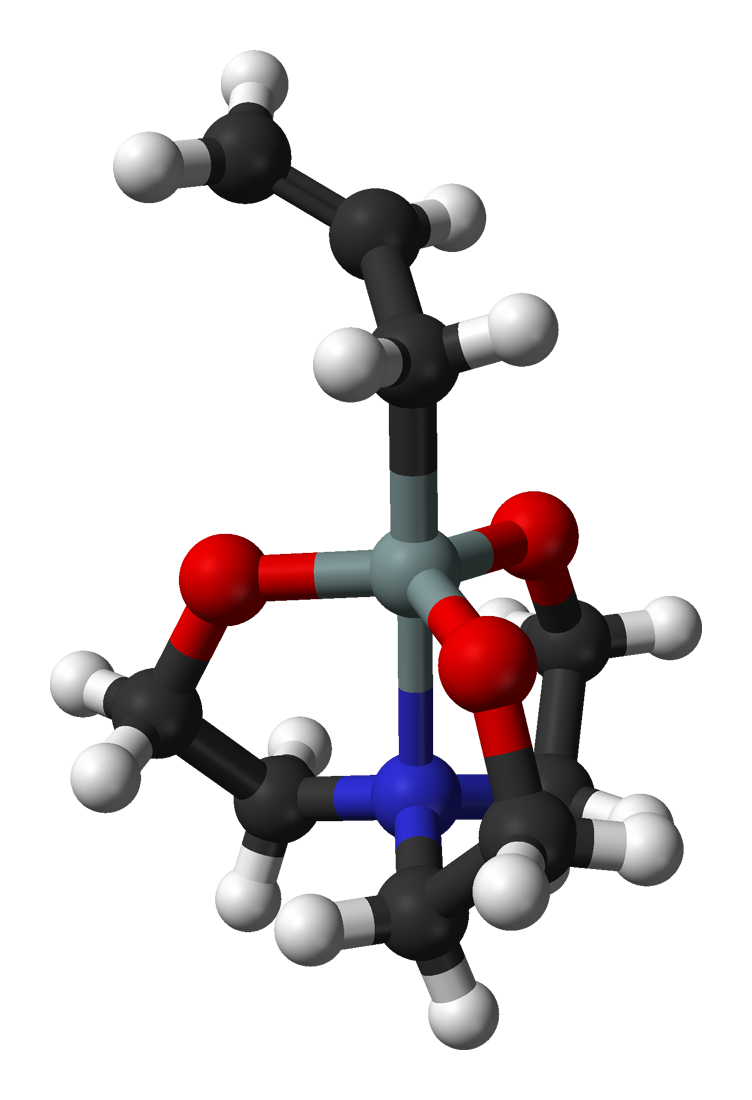
Ball-and-stick model of the allyl silatrane molecule

Fe(0)-N_{2} complex based on atrane framework.

Various atranes are named depending on the central element, e.g. "silatrane" (E = silicon); "boratrane" (E = boron); "phosphatrane" (E = phosphorus), stannatrane (E = tin), etc. It is also proposed that when Y = nitrogen, the prefix "aza" be inserted before element + "atrane" (azasilatrane, for example) because atranes wherein E = silicon and Y = oxygen have been referred to as just "silatranes".

Bis-atranes are two atrane cages that are fused end-to-end, sharing the same Lewis-acid donor atom in two co-axial dative interations.

== Structure and properties ==
From left to right: atrane, quasiatrane and proatrane

Silatranes exhibit unusual properties, as the transannular coordinate bond in atranes can be stretched (quasiatranes) and even broken (proatranes). The strength (and multiplicity) of the central bond depends on the stereoelectronic properties of the surrounding ligands, the electronegativity of the participating atoms, and the size of the rings. A strong driving force for the formation of the central bond is relief of ring strain from the otherwise-formed 8-membered rings.

Atranes exhibit biological activity in which the coordination of nitrogen to silane plays an important role. Some derivatives such as phenylsilatrane are highly toxic.

Protonation of Verkade base gives an atrane.

Proazaphosphatrane is a very strong non-ionic base and is utilized in various types of organic synthesis as an efficient catalyst.

== See also ==
- Hypervalent molecule
- Scorpionate ligand
- Chinese lantern structure
