= 1,2-Dihydro-1,2-azaborine =

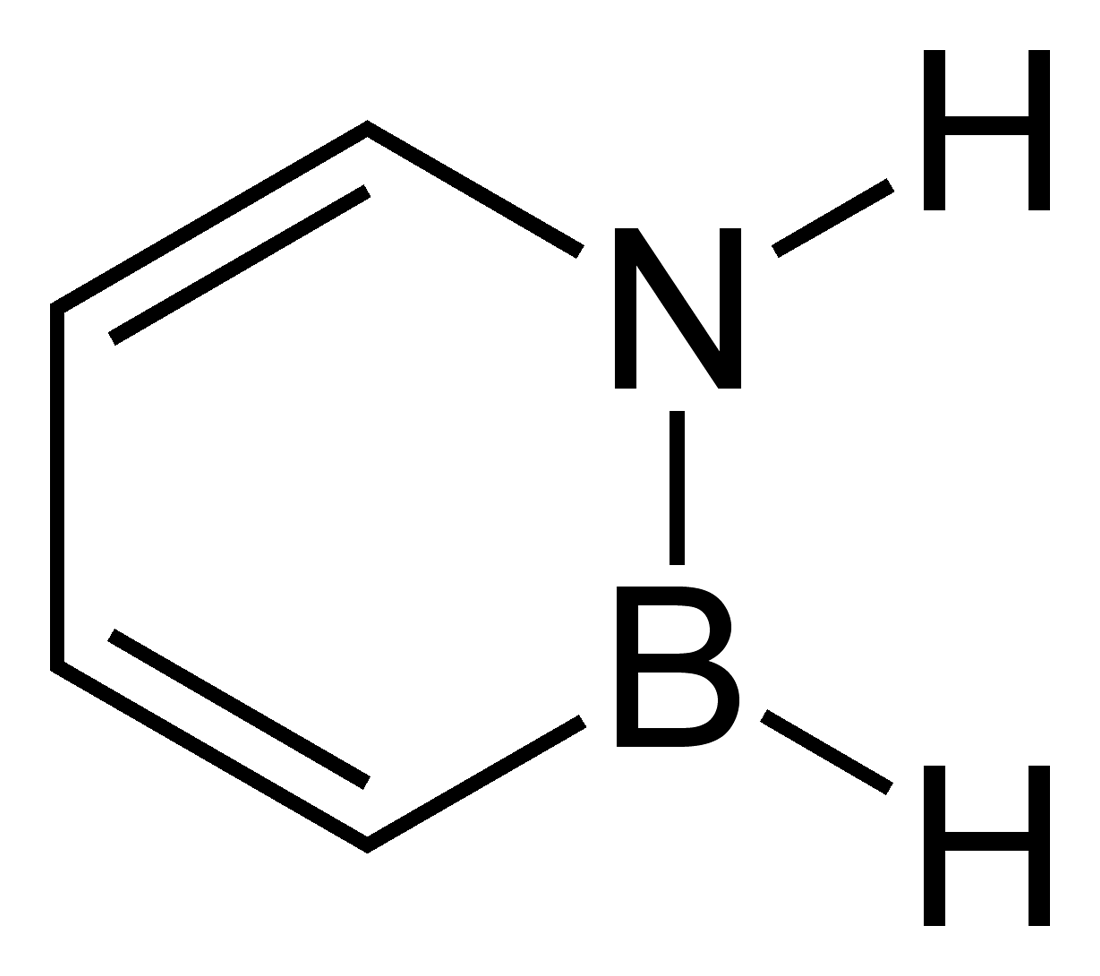

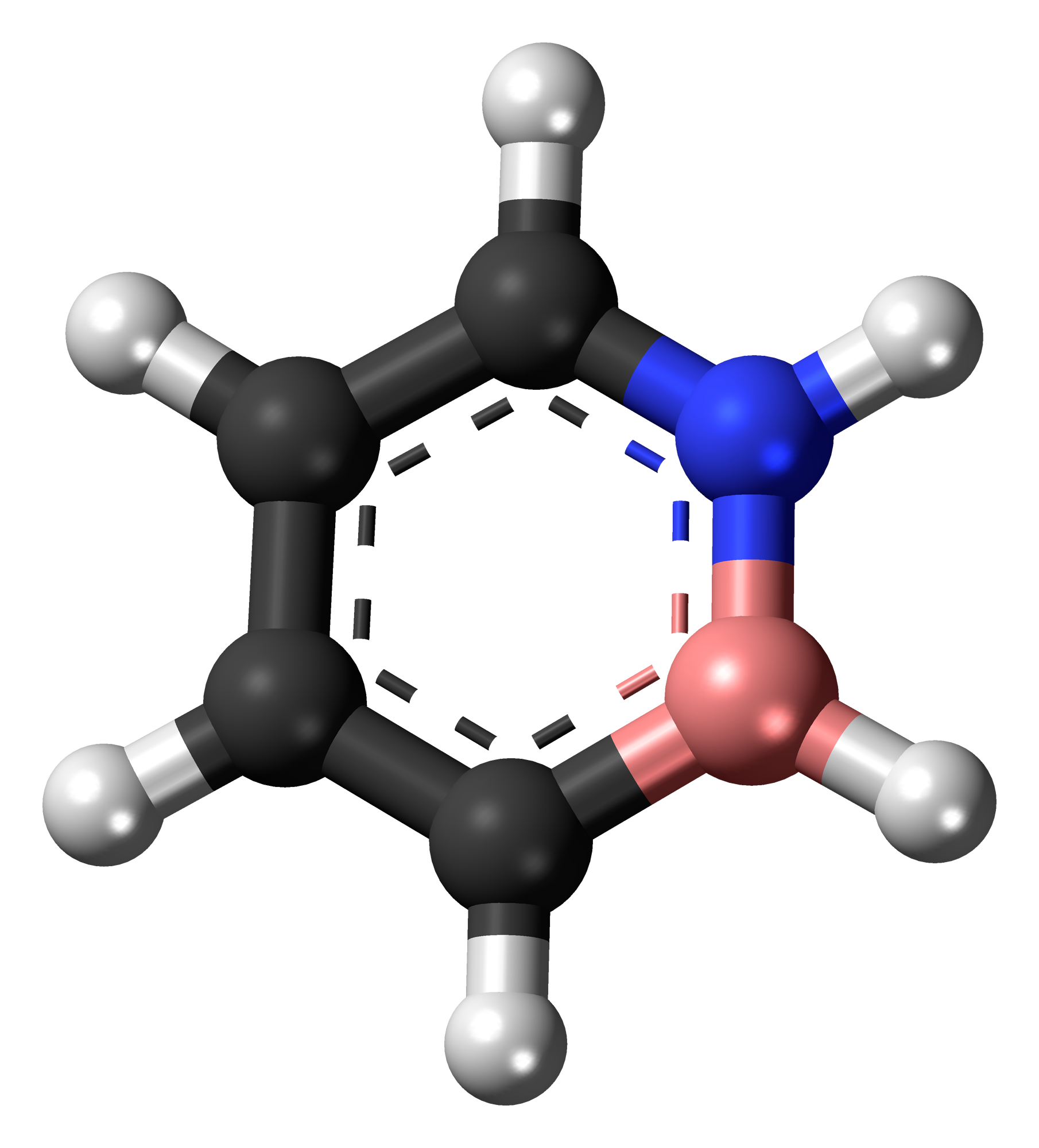

Names
- Preferred IUPAC name 1,2-Dihydro-1,2-azaborine

Identifiers
CAS Number	6680-69-9
3D model (JSmol)	Interactive image
ChemSpider	24769701
PubChem CID	12300196 PubChem has wrong formula
CompTox Dashboard (EPA)	DTXSID80486262
- InChI: InChI=1S/C4H6BN/c1-2-4-6-5-3-1/h1-6H Key: OGZZEGWWYQKMSO-UHFFFAOYSA-N
- SMILES: C1=CC=CNB1

Properties
Chemical formula	C_{4}H_{6}BN
Molar mass	78.908 g mol^{−1}
Appearance	clear, colorless liquid
Melting point	−46 to −45 °C.
- Except where otherwise noted, data are given for materials in their standard state (at 25 °C [77 °F], 100 kPa). verify (what is ?) Infobox references

1,2-Dihydro-1,2-azaborine is an aromatic chemical compound with properties intermediate between benzene and borazine. Its chemical formula is C_{4}BNH_{6}. It resembles a benzene ring, except that two adjacent carbons are replaced by nitrogen and boron, respectively. Several other 1,2-azaborines have been synthesized.

== Preparation ==
After decades of failed attempts, the compound was synthesized in 2008 and reported in January 2009.

One of the synthetic steps is a ring-closing metathesis (RCM) reaction:
