= Tolman's rule =

Rule describing chemical reactions

Tolman's rule states that, in certain chemical reactions, the steps involve exclusively intermediates of 18- and 16-electron configuration. The rule is an extension of the 18-electron rule. This rule was proposed by American chemist Chadwick A. Tolman. However, there are exceptions to Tolman's rule, even for reactions that proceed via 2e^{−} steps, because many reactions involve intermediates with fewer than 16 electrons.

Many examples of homogeneous catalysis involving organometallic complexes involve shuttling of complexes between 16- and 18-electron configurations. 16-electron complexes often form adducts with Lewis bases and, if low-valent, undergo oxidative addition.

CH_{3}I + cis-[Rh(CO)_{2}I_{2}]^{−} → [(CH_{3})Rh(CO)_{2}I_{3}]^{−}

Conversely, complexes of 18 electron configuration tend to dissociate ligands or undergo reductive elimination:

Rh(PPh_{3})_{3}ClH_{2} → Rh(PPh_{3})_{3}Cl + H_{2}

== See also ==
- Electron counting
