= Stannatrane =

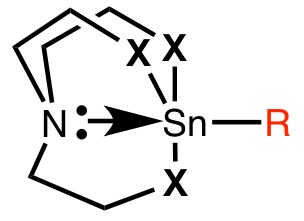
The general structure of a stannatrane reagent, where variants have been synthesized with X=C (carbastannatrane) and X=N (azastannatrane) and R is an alkyl or aryl substituent.

A stannatrane (IUPAC: 1-aza-5-stannabicyclo[3.3.3]undecane) is a tin-based atrane belonging to the larger class of organostannanes. Though the term stannatrane is often used to refer to the more commonly employed carbastannatrane, azastannatranes have also been synthesized (prefix refers to the identity of the atom bound directly to tin center). Stannatrane reagents offer highly selective methods for the incorporation of "R" substituents in complex molecules for late-stage diversification. These reagents differ from their tetraalkyl organostannane analogues in that there is no participation of dummy ligands in the transmetalation step, offering selective alkyl transfer in Stille Coupling reactions. These transmetalating agents are known to be air- and moisture-stable, as well as generally less toxic than their tetraalkyl counterparts.

== History and structural properties ==
The first carbastannatrane was reported in 1984 by Jurkschat and Tzschach. By reaction of an amino-triGrignard reagent with tin(IV) chloride to yield the stannatrane chloride, which was treated with methyl lithium to yield the corresponding methyl stannatrane. Based on a very small methyl J(^{119}Sn–^{13}C) coupling constant of 171 Hz, it was determined that the tin center of methyl stannatrane was indeed pentacoordinate, indicating nitrogen coordination.

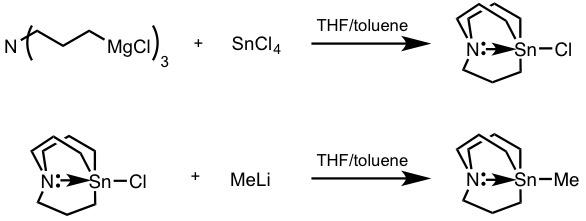
Synthesis of stannatrane chloride and methyl stannatrane by Jurkschat and colleagues.

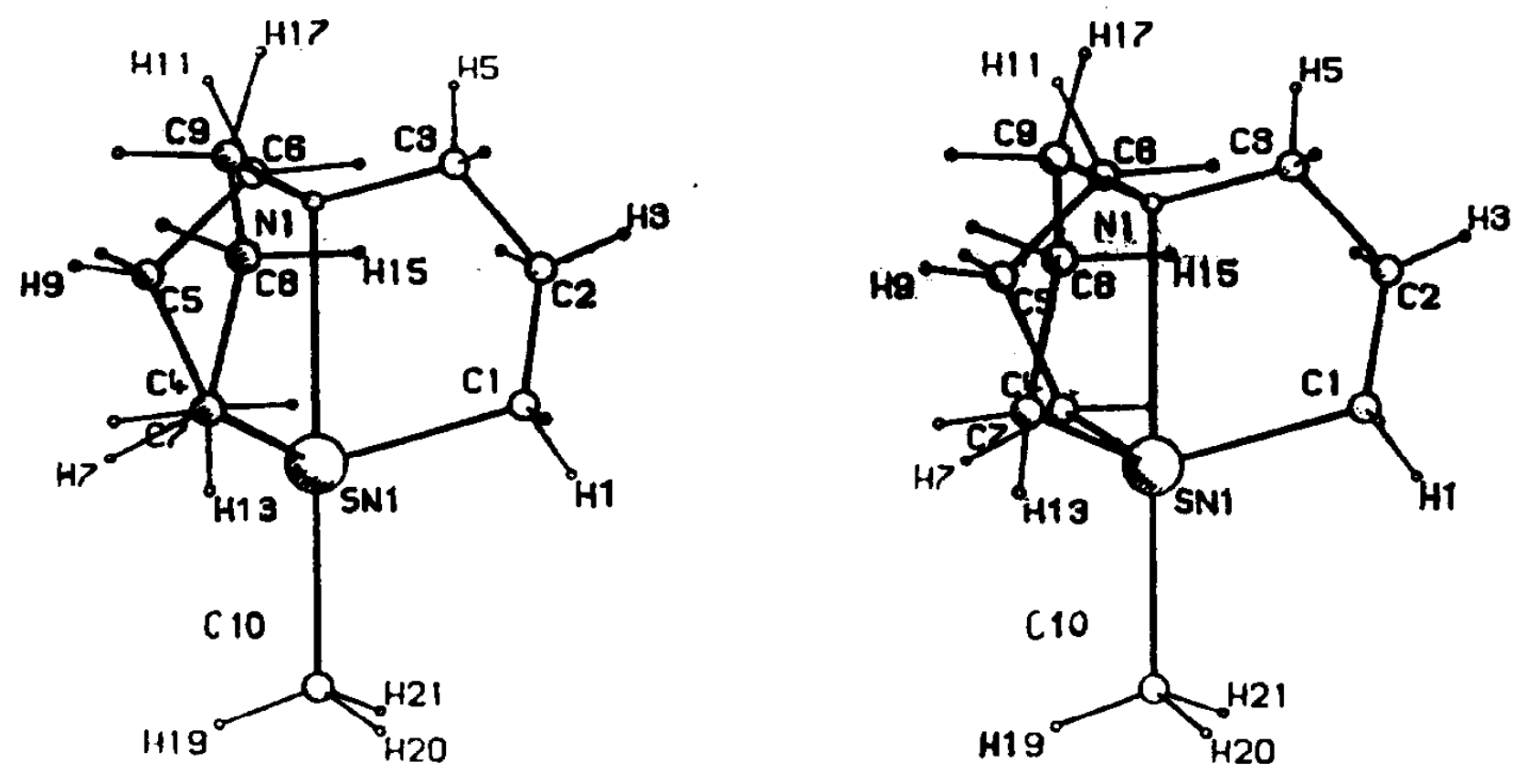
Stereoscopic representation of methyl stannatrane crystal structure.

The crystal and molecular structure was explained by X-ray crystallography. The X-ray diffraction study confirmed the tricyclic ring structure and gave insight toward the geometry of the complex. With a tin-nitrogen distance of 2.624 Å, the formal bond order was calculated to be about 0.46. The presence of the tin-nitrogen interaction, albeit weaker than anticipated, led to a few key discoveries: (1) the distortion from ideal trigonal bipyramidal toward monocapped tetrahedron geometry; (2) the lengthening of the apical tin-methyl bond by ~ 0.1 Å (largest known value for any existing tetraorganotin compounds); (3) the observation of unusual hybridization at the apical tin-methyl bond.

== Syntheses of alkyl stannatranes ==
A modified synthesis of atrane tricycle utilizes Schwartz's Reagent, triallylamine, and tin(IV) chloride in a one-pot method.

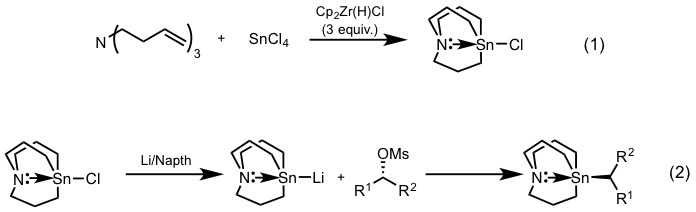
(1) Hydrozirconation method for synthesizing stannatrane chloride. (2) Synthesis of lithium carbastannatrane and subsequent mesylate displacement.

Though the latter step is still commonly used for functionalization of stannatrane chloride to simple alkyl derivatives via transmetalation, Biscoe and coworkers have developed a lithiation method that provides access to a variety of enantioenriched alkyl substituents from optically active mesylates (2). After treatment of stannatrane chloride with lithium napthalide, a lithium carbastannatrane was quenched with the corresponding enantiopure mesylate to yield the desired enantioenriched alkyl carbastannatrane in moderate yield with high enantiomeric excess.

== Applications in cross-coupling ==
The earliest reported use of carbastannatranes in palladium-catalyzed Stille coupling reactions in 1992 compared the efficiency of methyl stannatrane with tetramethyltin in the presence of aryl bromides and alkenyl iodides. Tetramethyltin only resulted in less than five percent conversion, whereas methyl stannatrane resulted in 67% yield under the same conditions. This difference was attributed to the nitrogen lone pair lengthening the tin-methyl bond, increasing its lability toward transmetalation. A method was developed for Stille couplings of aziridinyl stannatranes with aryl electrophiles.

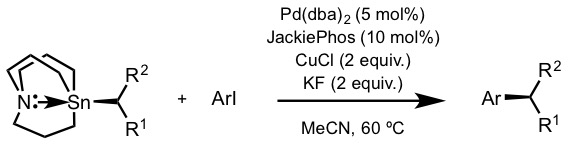
A stereoretentive Stille coupling using alkyl carbastannatranes.

Palladium also catalyzes Stille coupling of secondary alkyl carbastannatranes and aryl electrophiles. This report serves as the first example of employing chiral alkyl carbastannatrane reagents in enantioselective synthesis. Related methodology enable selective acyl substitution using enantioenriched stannatranes as an alternative to classical enolate chemistry.

A stannatrane-mediated Stille coupling was utilized for the synthesis of an anti-methicillin-resistant carbapenem to incorporate an entire side-chain in a single step.
