= Triethylphosphine =

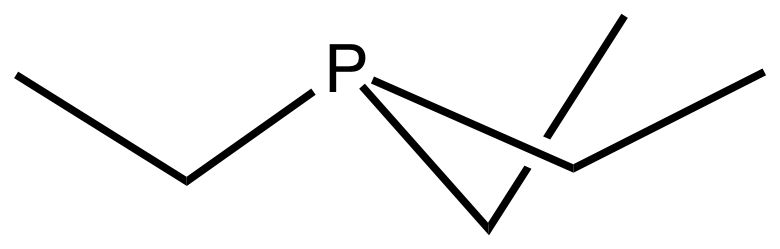

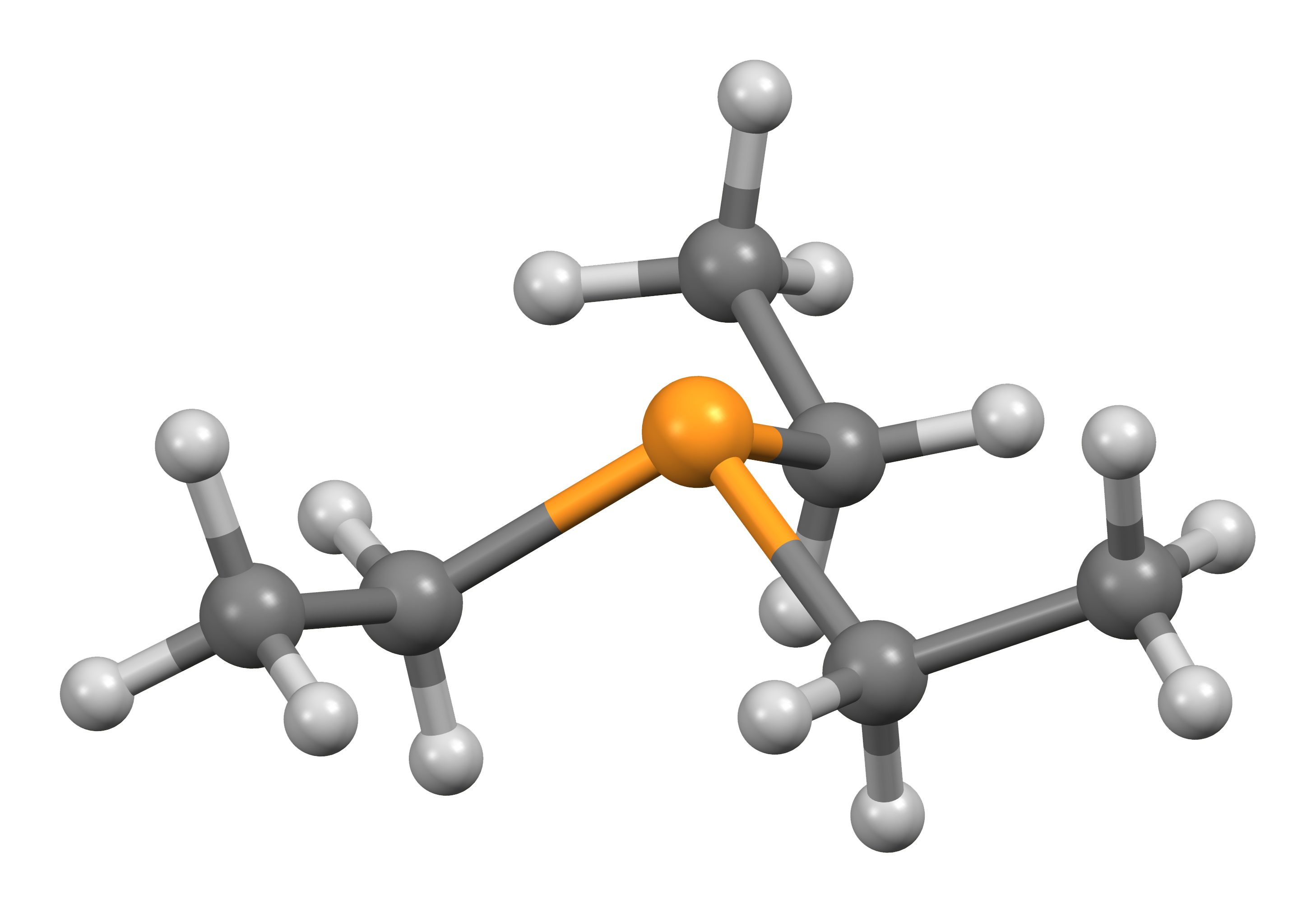

Names
- Preferred IUPAC name Triethylphosphane

Identifiers
CAS Number	554-70-1
3D model (JSmol)	Interactive image
ChEBI	CHEBI:39971
ChemSpider	25463
ECHA InfoCard	100.008.245
EC Number	209-068-8
Gmelin Reference	2485
PubChem CID	27365
UNII	5W435D16PM
CompTox Dashboard (EPA)	DTXSID3060293
- InChI: InChI=1S/C6H15P/c1-4-7(5-2)6-3/h4-6H2,1-3H3 Key: RXJKFRMDXUJTEX-UHFFFAOYSA-N
- SMILES: CCP(CC)CC

Properties
Chemical formula	C_{6}H_{15}P
Molar mass	118.160 g·mol^{−1}
Appearance	colorless liquid
Density	0.802 g/cm^{3}
Boiling point	127–128 °C (261–262 °F; 400–401 K)

Hazards
- GHS labelling
Pictograms	(GHS02: Flammable) (GHS05: Corrosive)
Signal word	Danger
Hazard statements	H224, H225, H250, H314
Precautionary statements	P210, P222, P233, P240, P241, P242, P243, P260, P264, P280, P301+P330+P331, P302+P334, P303+P361+P353, P304+P340, P305+P351+P338, P310, P321, P363, P370+P378, P403+P235, P405, P422, P501
- Except where otherwise noted, data are given for materials in their standard state (at 25 °C [77 °F], 100 kPa). Infobox references

Triethylphosphine is the organophosphorus compound with the formula P(CH_{2}CH_{3})_{3}, commonly abbreviated as PEt_{3}. It is a colorless liquid with an unpleasant odor characteristic of alkylphosphines. The compound is a common ligand in organometallic chemistry, such as in auranofin.

== Structure and simple reactions ==
It is a pyramidal molecule with approximate C_{3v} symmetry.

PEt_{3} is usually prepared using Grignard reagents:

3 CH_{3}CH_{2}MgCl + P(OC_{6}H_{5})_{3} → P(CH_{2}CH_{3})_{3} + 3 C_{6}H_{5}OMgCl

PEt_{3} reacts with strong acids to give salts [HPEt_{3}]X. This reaction is reversible. Similarly, it is also easily alkylated to give phosphonium derivatives. PEt_{3} is easily oxidised to the phosphine oxide with oxygen.

== Coordination chemistry ==
Triethylphosphine is a highly basic ligand that forms coordination complexes with many metals. As a ligand, triethylphosphine's Tolman cone angle is 132°. Being a relatively compact phosphine, several can bind to a single transition metal, as illustrated by the existence of Pt(PEt_{3})_{4}. As a phosphine ligand, triethylphosphine gained acceptance earlier than did the simpler trimethylphosphine, as illustrated by the preparation of the hydride complex trans-PtHCl(PEt_{3})_{2}.

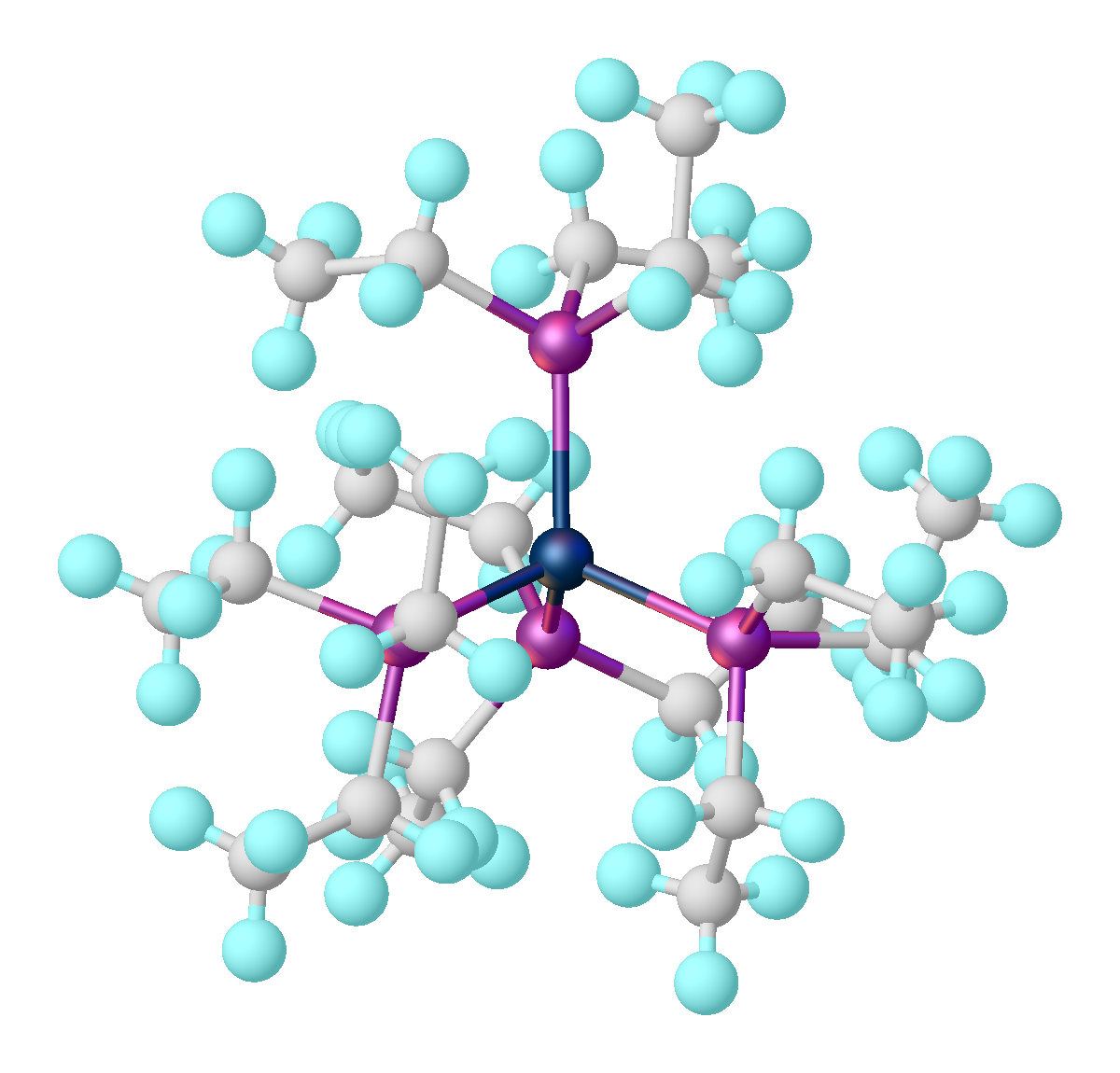
Structure of Pt(PEt_{3})_{4}.

== Safety ==
PEt_{3} is toxic. It converts to a low toxicity phosphine oxide upon treatment with sodium hypochlorite or hydrogen peroxide.
