= Dimethylaminophosphorus dichloride =

Names
- Other names dimethylaminochlorophosphine, dimethylphosphoramidous dichloride

Identifiers
CAS Number	683-85-2
3D model (JSmol)	Interactive image
ChemSpider	120252
PubChem CID	136483
CompTox Dashboard (EPA)	DTXSID90218455
- InChI: InChI=1S/C2H6Cl2NP/c1-5(2)6(3)4/h1-2H3 Key: XPWWDZRSNFSLRQ-UHFFFAOYSA-N
- SMILES: CN(C)P(Cl)Cl

Properties
Chemical formula	C_{2}H_{6}Cl_{2}NP
Molar mass	145.95 g·mol^{−1}
Appearance	colorless liquid
Density	1.264 g/cm^{3}
Boiling point	40 °C (104 °F; 313 K) 10 torr

Hazards
- GHS labelling
Pictograms	(GHS02: Flammable) (GHS05: Corrosive)
Signal word	Danger
Hazard statements	H225, H314
Precautionary statements	P210, P233, P240, P241, P242, P243, P260, P264, P280, P301+P330+P331, P303+P361+P353, P304+P340, P305+P351+P338, P310, P321, P363, P370+P378, P403+P235, P405, P501
- Except where otherwise noted, data are given for materials in their standard state (at 25 °C [77 °F], 100 kPa). Infobox references

Dimethylaminophosphorus dichloride is an organophosphorus compound with the formula Me_{2}NPCl_{2} (Me = methyl). A colorless liquid, it is a reagent in the preparation of other organophosphorus compounds. Many analogous compounds can be prepared from the reactions of secondary amines and phosphorus trichloride:

2 R_{2}NH + PCl_{3} → R_{2}NPCl_{2} + R_{2}NH_{2}Cl

== Reactions ==
Further equivalents of amine react with dialkylaminophosphorus dichlorides:

2 R_{2}NH + R_{2}NPCl_{2} → (R_{2}N)_{2}PCl + R_{2}NH_{2}Cl

Since the P-NR_{2} bond is not attacked by Grignard reagents, dimethylaminophosphorus dichloride can be selectively dimethylated:

2 MeMgBr + Me_{2}NPCl_{2} → Me_{2}NPMe_{2} + 2 MgBrCl

The resulting dimethylphosphino derivative, a structural relative of tetramethylhydrazine, reacts with hydrogen chloride to give chlorodimethylphosphine:

Me_{2}NPMe_{2} + 2 HCl → ClPMe_{2} + Me_{2}NH_{2}Cl
