= Tolima =

Tolima may refer to:

- Tolima Department of Colombia
- Nevado del Tolima, a volcano in Colombia
- Deportes Tolima, a Colombian football (soccer) team in the First Division
- Tolima State, Colombia, which existed from 1861 to 1869
- Tolima or Panche, an indigenous group in Colombia
- Old Armenian name for Tolma
- Tolima (moth), a genus of moths in the tribe Anerastiini
- Valle Tolima, an area of Caguas, Puerto Rico
