= Tolman electronic parameter =

Concept in organic chemistry

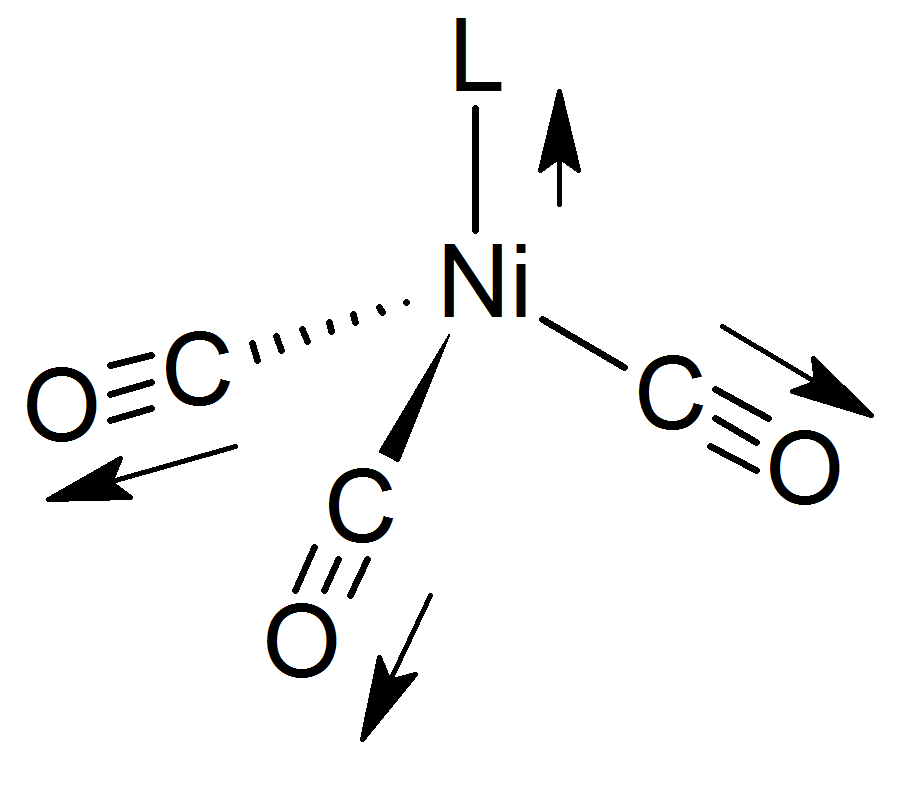
The A_{1} "stretch" mode of Ni(CO)_{3}L used to determine the TEP of L.

The Tolman electronic parameter (TEP) is a measure of the electron donating or withdrawing ability of a ligand. It is traditionally determined by measuring the frequency of the A1 C-O vibrational mode (ν(CO)) of a (pseudo)-C3v symmetric complex, [LNi(CO)3] by infrared spectroscopy, where L is the ligand of interest. [LNi(CO)3] was chosen as the model compound because such complexes are readily prepared from tetracarbonylnickel(0). Analogous tetrahedral and square planar complexes, such as rhodium carbonyl chlorides, have also been utilized in measuring the chelating strength of a ligand. The shift in ν(CO) reflects how L alters metal→CO backbonding through its σ‑donor and π‑acceptor (or π‑donor) character. Strong σ‑donor/π‑donor ligands increase metal→CO backbonding, weakening the C≡O bond and lowering ν(CO), whereas weaker donors or π‑acceptors decrease backbonding and raise ν(CO). This balance between donation and back‑donation governs ligand effects on metal–ligand bond strengths, geometries, and reactivity in other complexes, providing a method of categorizing ligands in order. The analysis was introduced by Chadwick A. Tolman.

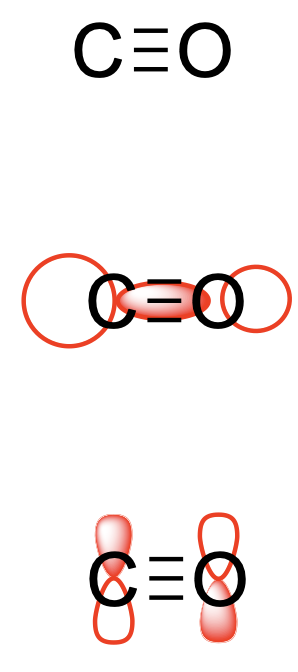
The HOMO and LUMO, respectively, interact wth different orbitals of the metal.

== Inspiration and discovery ==
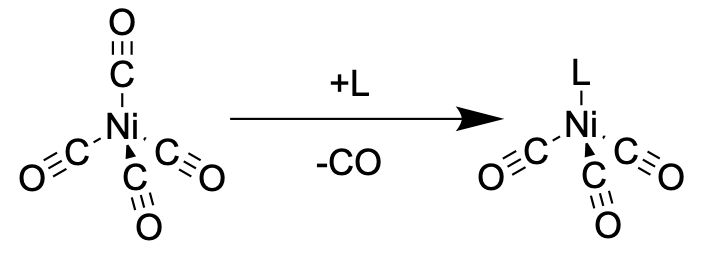
The above reaction is used to prepare relevant Nickel complexes, which is then used to determine Tolman Electronic Parameters.

Tolman's work was preceded by previous definitions of the Metal-Ligand bond, as defined by Dewar–Chatt–Duncanson as a combination of sigma-donation from the ligand to the metal and pi-bond "back-bonding" from the metal to the vacant ligand orbitals. Tolman himself was contemporaries with Walter Strohmeier, who along with Tolman investigated the sigma-donor ability and pi-acceptor strength of various ligands when coordinated to different metal centers. Tolman focused specifically on phosphine ligands, first cataloguing their general reactivity and then in 1970 measuring their CO frequencies seen when said ligands displace a carbon monoxide: the 70 ligands studied in his 1970 paper was the first iteration in which these vibrational frequencies were used as a parameter to determine characteristics of a ligand. Further work on phosphenes in the context of Ni(0) complexes were done: the term itself was coined in 1977, when Tolman utilized these bonding frequencies to describe the net donor properties of several phosphine ligands Since then, the scope of what is measurable through the Tolman Electronic Parameter has expanded greatly, and several resources are available for near-exhaustive lists of ligands' strengths measured through this method.

== Theory & methodology ==
=== Phosphines ===
In Ni(CO)_{3}L complexes, the three CO ligands are arranged in a pseudo‑C_{3v} geometry. Group theory shows that the three C–O stretching vibrations transform as 2A₁ + E: of these, only one A_{1} mode corresponds to the totally symmetric, in‑phase stretching of all three CO ligands. This A_{1} mode is both IR‑active and relatively isolated in the spectrum, giving a single, well‑resolved ν_{(CO)} band that can be assigned unambiguously.

Due to the geometry of the complex, these vibrations are symmetric. Its frequency, therefore is especially sensitive to changes in the overall electron density at the metal center. Upon coordination of CO to a metal, ν(CO) typically decreases from 2143 cm^{−1} of free CO. Stronger σ‑donor / π‑donor ligands increase π backbonding, weakening all three C≡O bonds further and lowering the A_{1} ν_{(CO)}, whereas weaker donors or π‑acceptor ligands decrease backbonding and hence shows a smaller decrease in ν_{(CO)}. Monitoring only this A_{1} symmetric stretch therefore provides a clean, reproducible probe of the net electronic influence of L, which is the basis of the Tolman electronic parameter.

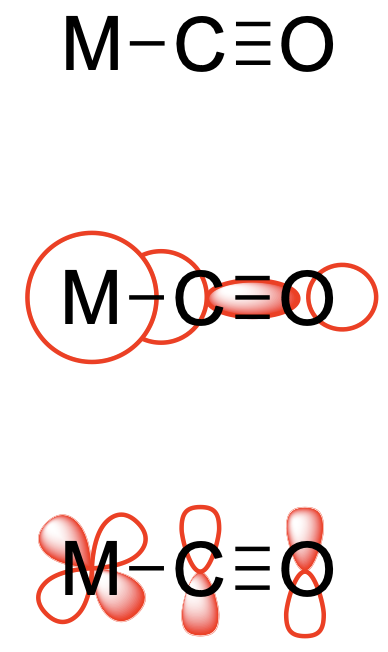
The metal-carbon backbonding interaction weakens the carbon-oxygen bond, resulting in a lower vibrational frequency of CO.

TEP for selected phosphines
L	ν(CO) cm^{−1}
P(t-Bu)_{3}	2056.1
P(NMe_{2})_{3}	2061.9
PMe_{3}	2064.1
P(C_{6}H_{4}OMe)_{3}	2066
PPh_{3}	2068.9
P(C_{6}H_{4}F)_{3}	2071.3
P(OEt)_{3}	2076.3
PCl_{3}	2097.0
PF_{3}	2110.8

=== N-Heterocyclic Carbenes (NHCs) ===
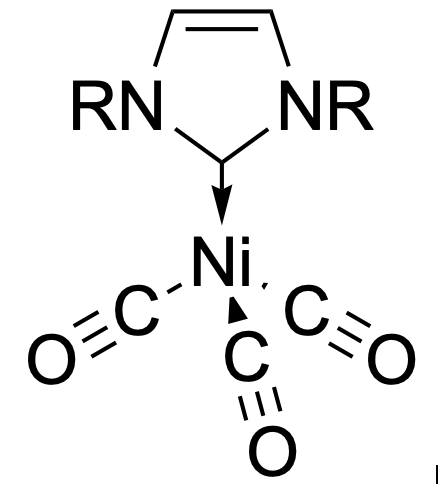
An NHC ligand inserted into a Ni(CO)3 complex, which would allow it to measure its TEP.

Tolman's original 1977 paper exclusively featured phosphines, utilizing tri-tert-butylphosphine as a baseline given its extremely basic nature. Because TEP is really a general measure of how a ligand alters metal→CO backbonding, though, the same idea can be applied to ligand classes beyond phosphines, such as N‑heterocyclic carbenes (NHCs), and even to different metal–carbonyl reference complexes. Further work done by Arduengo in the field of carbenes led to some of these N-heterocyclic carbene (NHC) ligands to be ranked according to IR spectral data recorded on cis-[RhCl(NHC)(CO)_{2}] complexes.

== Other ligand electronic parameters ==
A large limiting factor to the TEP is the fact that a clear, quantitative trend directly between the electronic parameter and the metal-ligand bond strength is absent. Additionally, its inability to separate σ‑donor from π‑acceptor contributions, exclusivity to mono-dentate ligands, and its sensitivity to experimental conditions, have raised needs for a revised electronic parameter.

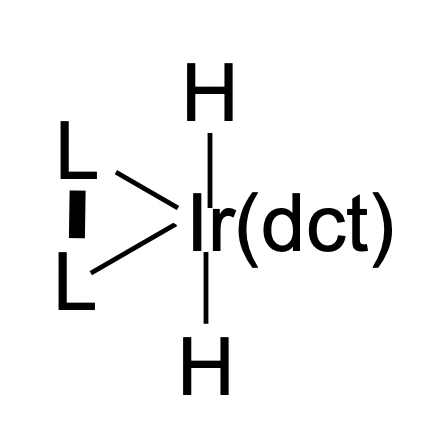
The synthesis of Ir(dct)H2L2, where L2 is a chelating ligand and dct is short for Dibenzocyclooctatetraene, was done by Robert Crabtree and served as the framework from which non-monodentate ligand electron parameters were started.

Several schemes in literature use Tolman's work to use other metal centers to rank the donor properties of ligands. Work by Robert Crabtree introduced a method to test chelating phosphines, with more current work showing good correlation to previously existing literature / TEP. The HEP scale ranks ligands on the basis of the ^{13}C NMR shift of a reference ligand. A. B. P. Lever's electronic parameter ranking utilizes the Ru(II/III) couple. A competing scale utilized Chromium metal centers instead, evaluating ligands on the basis of the redox couples of [Cr(CO)_{5}L]^{0/+}. Hammett Substituent Constants, given that they measure the electronic influence of different substances relative to a baseline, can also be considered a useful parameter to compare against TEP when relevant. The toxicity of the precursor to the TEP, Nickel tetracarbonyl, as well as some ligands of interest not coordinating well to the Nickel center, has led to research towards finding alternatives to TEP.

== See also ==
- Metal carbonyl
- Tolman cone angle
