= Chadwick A. Tolman =

American chemist (1938–2024)

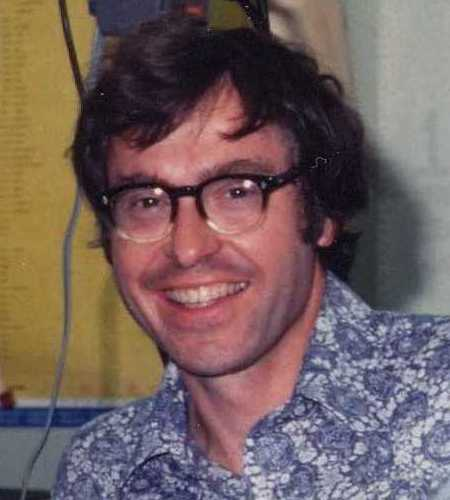
- Tolman in 1976
- Born: October 1938; Salt Lake City, Utah, U.S.
- Died: April 6, 2024 (aged 85); Maris Grove, Pennsylvania, U.S.
- Education: Massachusetts Institute of Technology, University of California - Berkeley
- Known for: Tolman cone angle Tolman electronic parameter Tolman's rule Selective oxidation of organics Global Warming
- Awards: Delaware Audubon Conservation Award (2009)
- Scientific career
- Fields: Inorganic chemistry
- Workplaces: DuPont Central Research, Delaware Technical & Community College, University of Delaware, National Science Foundation, National Academy of Sciences
- Doctoral advisor: William Dulaney Gwinn

Chadwick Alma Tolman (October 1938 – April 6, 2024) was an American chemist. He obtained his B.S. in Chemistry from Massachusetts Institute of Technology. He earned his Ph.D. in Chemistry as a microwave spectroscopist from U.C. Berkeley under the guidance of William Dulaney Gwinn.

== Biography ==
Tolman joined DuPont Central Research in 1965. His early work was on late transition metal complexes with phosphorus ligands. The Tolman cone angle and Tolman electronic parameter are named after him. In 1972, he proposed the 16 and 18 electron rule, extending Irving Langmuir's 18-Electron rule to include the many examples of stable 16 electron square planar d^{8} complexes. Later work focused on the activation of C-H bonds by transition metal complexes and free radical oxidation of cyclohexane for the production of adipic acid, an intermediate in the manufacture of nylon.

Tolman was instrumental in the founding of the Delaware Science Alliance and took a year's leave of absence from DuPont to serve as Chair of the Coordinating Committee to help make the Alliance self-sustaining. The primary goal of the Science Alliances was to link scientists interested in education to teachers looking for help in the classroom. Programs include an Elementary Science Olympiad, workshops for volunteers and elementary teachers, summer fellowships in local industry for secondary teachers, and classroom visits and demonstrations by industrial scientists.

Upon retirement from DuPont in 1996, Tolman taught at Delaware Technical & Community College and University of Delaware for a year before joining the National Science Foundation as a program officer in the Chemistry Division. That was followed by two years at the National Academy of Science in the Division of Earth and Life Sciences. His work there included studies and major reports on air pollution and air quality management.

Tolman followed and communicated about climate change issues for over 20 years. He wrote a monthly electronic blog, Climate Change News. He helped write the Statement of Conscience on the Threat of Global Warming/Climate Change for the Unitarian Universalist Association which was adopted by their General Assembly in 2006.

Tolman served on a number of advisory committees. He chaired the Energy Committee of the Delaware Chapter of the Sierra Club, and was a member of the Advocacy Committee of the Delaware Nature Society. He was on the Energy Committee of the Delaware League of Women Voters, and the Climate Change Task Force of the U.S. League of Women Voters, where he helped write the Toolkit for Climate Change Action He served on the Greenhouse Gas Reduction Advisory Committee and the Sea Level Rise Advisory Committee of the State of Delaware.

Tolman was presented the Delaware Audubon Conservation Award at the Delaware Audubon Society Annual Meeting on October 9, 2009.

Tolman died in Maris Grove, Pennsylvania, on April 6, 2024, at the age of 85.
