= Annulation =

Chemical reaction constructing a new ring on a molecule

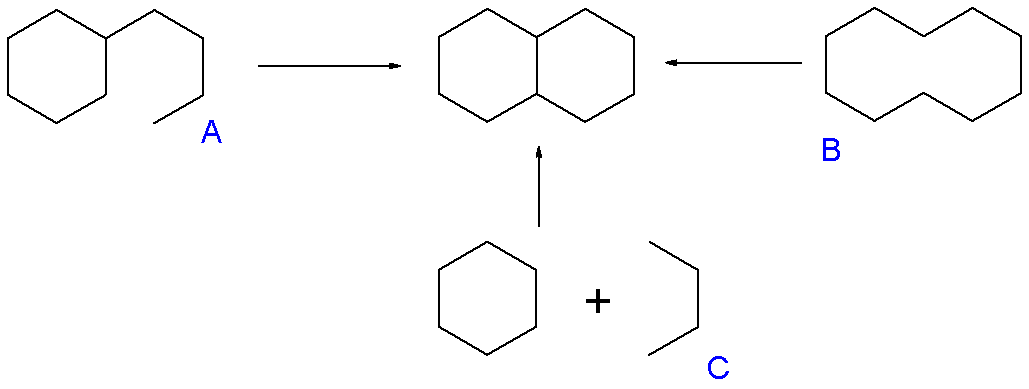
Annulation: A) intramolecular ring closing; B) transannulation; C) cycloaddition

In organic chemistry, annulation (from Latin anellus 'little ring'; occasionally annelation) is a chemical reaction in which a new ring is constructed on a molecule. Examples are the Robinson annulation, Danheiser annulation and certain cycloadditions. Annular molecules are constructed from side-on condensed cyclic segments, for example helicenes and acenes.

== Transannulation ==
In transannulation a bicyclic molecule is created by intramolecular carbon-carbon bond formation in a large monocyclic ring. An example is the samarium(II) iodide induced ketone - alkene cyclization of 5-methylenecyclooctanone which proceeds through a ketyl intermediate:

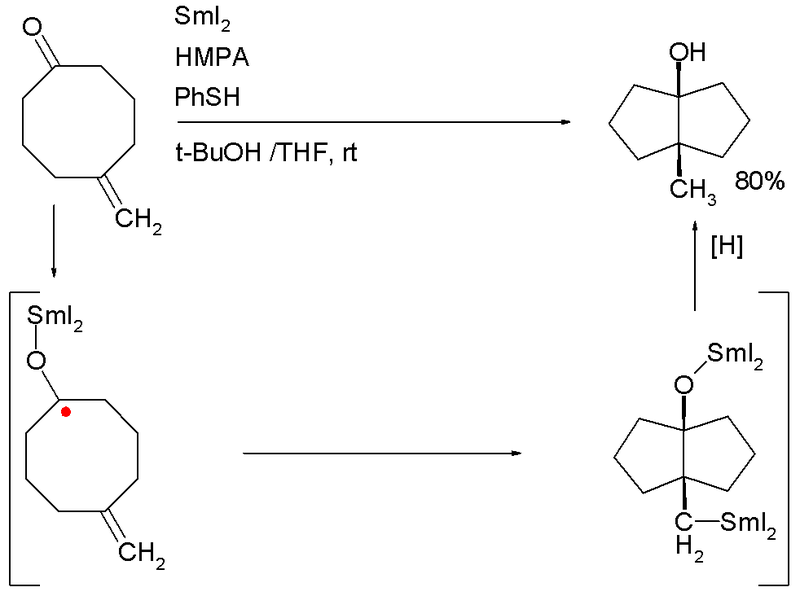
Ketone olefin cyclization

== Transannular interaction ==
Protonation of Verkade base induces a transannular bonding, giving an atrane.

A transannular interaction in chemistry is any chemical interaction (favorable or nonfavorable) between different non-bonding molecular groups in a large ring or macrocycle. See for example atranes.

== Benzannulation ==
The term benzannulated compounds refers to derivatives of cyclic compounds (usually aromatic) which are fused to a benzene ring. Examples are listed in the table below:

Benzannulated derivative	Source of cyclic compound
Benzopyrene	Pyrene
Quinoline	Pyridine
Isoquinoline	Pyridine
Chromene	Pyran
Isochromene	Pyran
Indole	Pyrrole
Isoindole	Pyrrole
Benzofuran	Furan
Isobenzofuran	Furan
Benzimidazole	Imidazole

In contemporary chemical literature, the term benzannulation also means "construction of benzene rings from acyclic precursors".
