= Tris(dimethylamino)phosphine =

Names
- Preferred IUPAC name N,N,N′,N′,N′′,N′′-Hexamethylphosphanetriamine
- Other names: Hexamethylphosphorous triamide; HMPT

Identifiers
CAS Number	1608-26-0
3D model (JSmol)	Interactive image
ChemSpider	14616
ECHA InfoCard	100.015.032
EC Number	216-534-4
Gmelin Reference	906778
PubChem CID	15355
RTECS number	TH3390000
UNII	6072HG2UW4
CompTox Dashboard (EPA)	DTXSID6061816
- InChI: InChI=1S/C6H18N3P/c1-7(2)10(8(3)4)9(5)6/h1-6H3 Key: XVDBWWRIXBMVJV-UHFFFAOYSA-N
- SMILES: CN(C)P(N(C)C)N(C)C

Properties
Chemical formula	C_{6}H_{18}N_{3}P
Molar mass	163.205 g·mol^{−1}
Appearance	colorless liquid
Density	0.898 g/cm^{3}
Boiling point	49 °C (120 °F; 322 K) 11 torr

Hazards
- GHS labelling
Pictograms	(GHS02: Flammable)
Signal word	Warning
Hazard statements	H226
Precautionary statements	P210, P233, P240, P241, P242, P243, P280, P303+P361+P353, P370+P378, P403+P235, P501
- Except where otherwise noted, data are given for materials in their standard state (at 25 °C [77 °F], 100 kPa). Infobox references

Tris(dimethylamino)phosphine is an organophosphorus compound with the formula P(NMe_{2})_{3} (Me = methyl). It is a colorless oil at room temperature, and is one of the most common aminophosphines. Its structure has been determined by X-ray crystallography.

Tris(dimethylamino)phosphine acts as a base. It reacts with oxygen to give hexamethylphosphoramide, O=P(NMe_{2})_{3}, and with sulfur to give the corresponding compound hexamethylthiophosphoramide, S=P(NMe_{2})_{3}. It can also act as a ligand, forming complexes with a variety of metal centers. Its steric and electronic properties are similar to those of triisopropylphosphine.

Because of its affinity for sulfur, tris(dimethylamino)phosphine is also effective as a desulfurization agent, e.g., in the conversion of dibenzyl disulfide into dibenzyl sulfide:

PhCH_{2}SSCH_{2}Ph + P(NMe_{2})_{3} → S=P(NMe_{2})_{3} + PhCH_{2}SCH_{2}Ph (Ph = phenyl)
