= Persistent carbene =

Type of carbene demonstrating particular stability

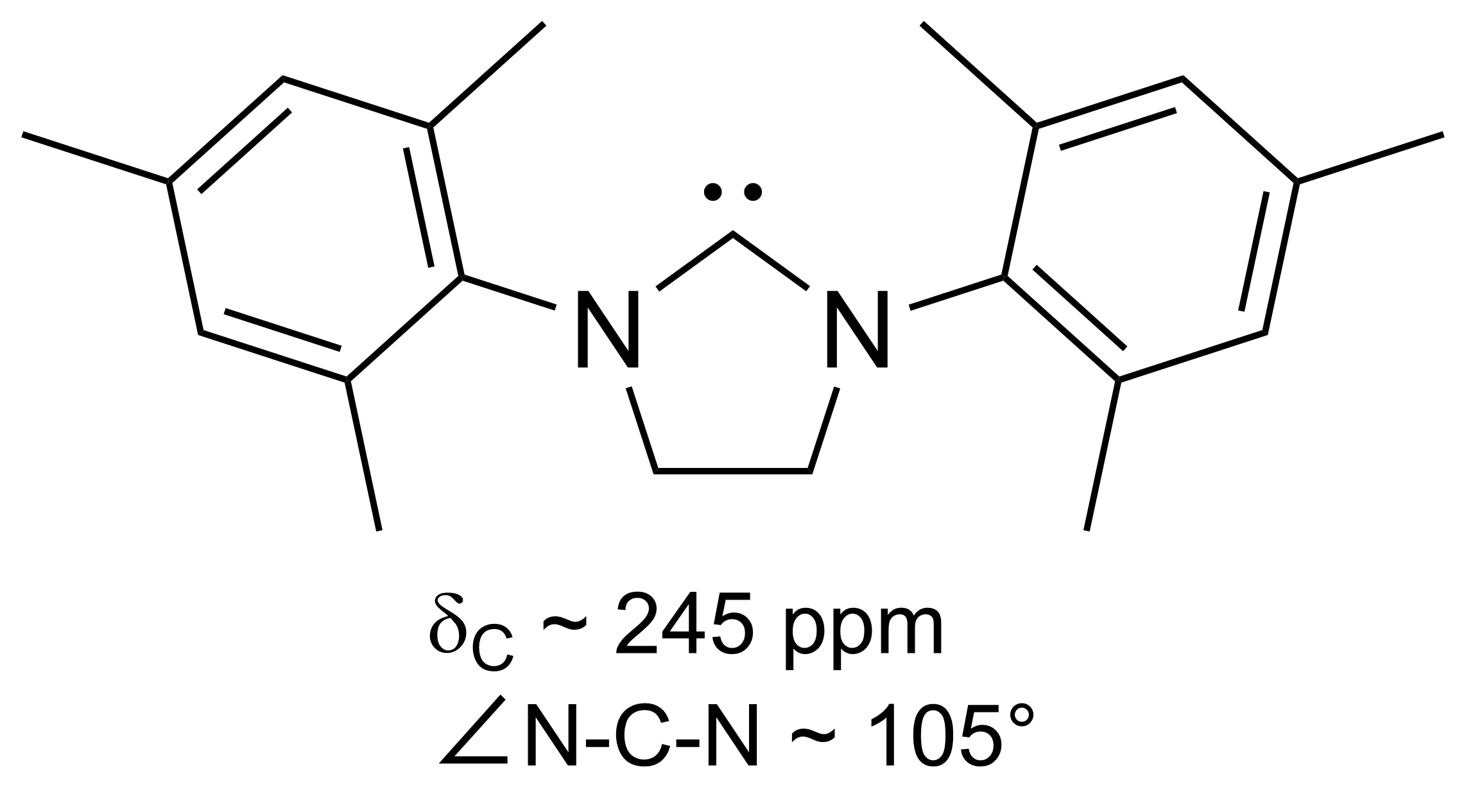
1,3-Dimesityl-imidazol-4,5-dihydro-2-ylidene, a representative persistent carbene

A persistent carbene (also known as stable carbene) is an organic molecule whose natural resonance structure has a carbon atom with incomplete octet (a carbene), but does not exhibit the tremendous instability typically associated with such moieties. The best-known examples and by far largest subgroup are the N-heterocyclic carbenes (NHC) (sometimes called Arduengo carbenes), in which nitrogen atoms flank the formal carbene.

Modern theoretical analysis suggests that the term "persistent carbene" is in fact a misnomer. Persistent carbenes do not in fact have a carbene electronic structure in their ground state, but instead an ylide stabilized by aromatic resonance or steric shielding. Acid catalyzes the carbene-like dimerization that some persistent carbenes undergo over the course of days.

Persistent carbenes in general, and Arduengo carbenes in particular, are popular ligands in organometallic chemistry.

== History ==
=== Early evidence ===
In 1957, Ronald Breslow proposed that a relatively stable nucleophilic carbene derivied from vitamin B_{1} (thiamine), was the catalyst involved in the benzoin condensation that yields furoin from furfural. In this cycle, the vitamin's thiazolium ring exchanges a hydrogen atom (attached to carbon 2 of the ring) for a furfural residue. In deuterated water, the C2-proton was found to rapidly exchange for a deuteron in a statistical equilibrium:

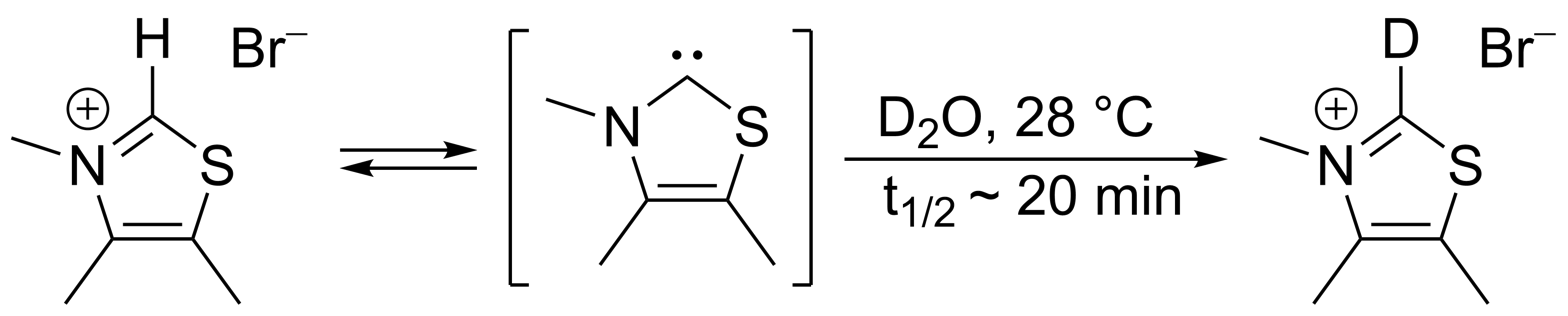
Deuterium exchange of the C2-proton of thiazolium salt.

This exchange was proposed to proceed via intermediacy of a thiazol-2-ylidene. In 2012 the isolation of the so-called Breslow intermediate was reported.

In 1960, Hans-Werner Wanzlick and coworkers conjectured that carbenes derived from dihydroimidazol-2-ylidene were produced by vacuum pyrolysis of the corresponding 2-trichloromethyl dihydroimidazole compounds with the loss of chloroform. They conjectured that the carbene existed in equilibrium with its dimer, a tetraaminoethylene derivative, the so-called Wanzlick equilibrium. This conjecture was challenged by Lemal and coworkers in 1964, who presented evidence that the dimer did not dissociate; and by Winberg in 1965. However, subsequent experiments by Denk, Herrmann and others have confirmed this equilibrium, albeit in specific circumstances.

=== Isolation ===
In 1970, Wanzlick's group generated imidazol-2-ylidene carbenes by the deprotonation of an imidazolium salt. Wanzlick as well as Roald Hoffmann, proposed that these imidazole-based carbenes should be more stable than their 4,5-dihydro analogues, due to Hückel-type aromaticity. Wanzlick did not however isolate imidazol-2-ylidenes, but instead their coordination compounds with mercury and isothiocyanate:

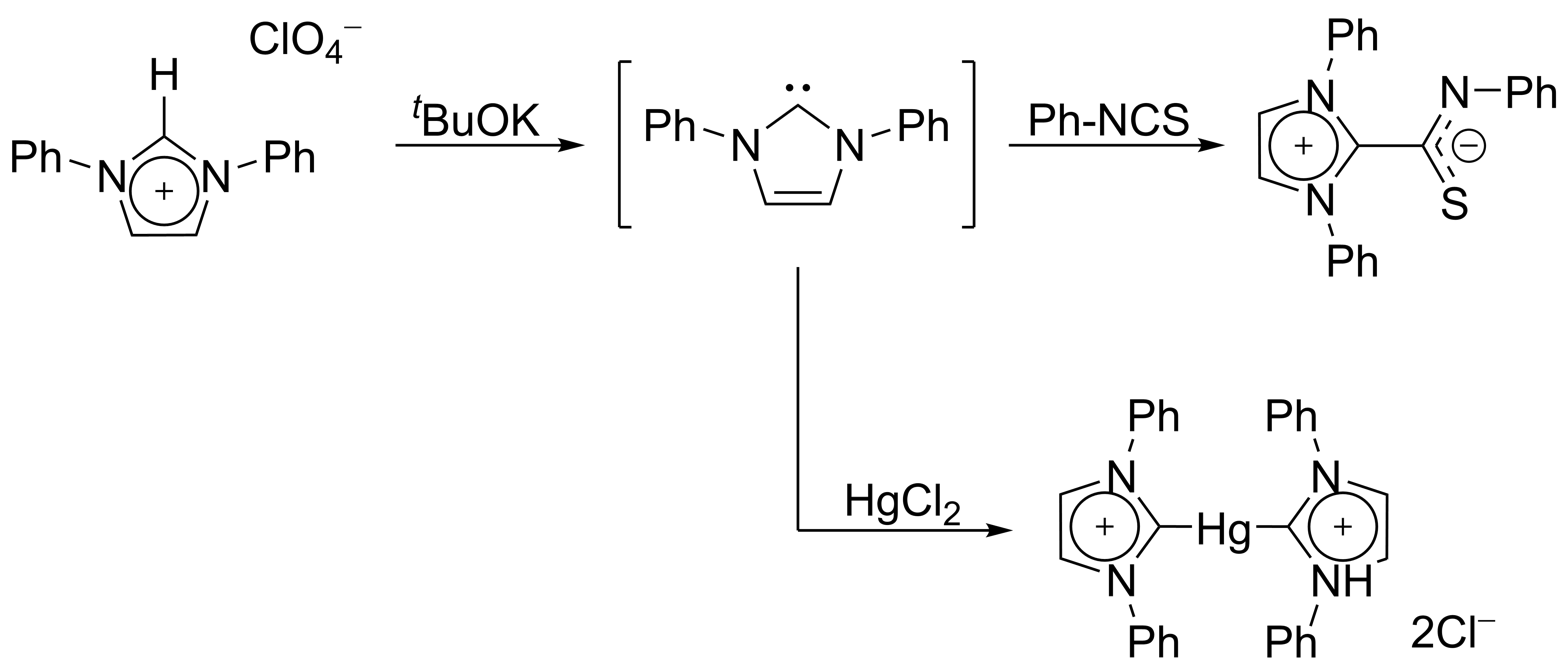
Preparation and trapping of an imidazol-2-ylidene.

In 1988, Guy Bertrand and others isolated a phosphinocarbene. These species can be represented as either a λ^{3}-phosphinocarbene or λ^{5}-phosphaacetylene:

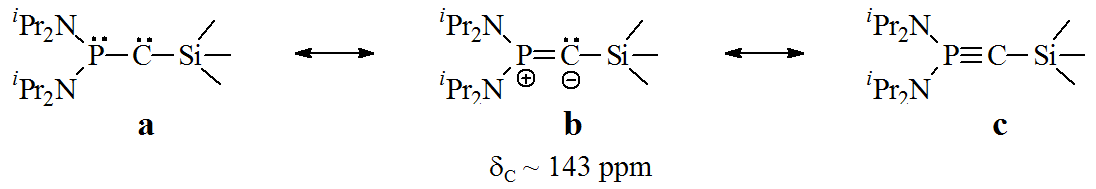
Alkyne and carbene resonances structures of Bertrand's carbene

These compounds were called "push-pull carbenes" in reference to the contrasting electron affinities of the phosphorus and silicon atoms, and exhibited both carbenic and alkynic reactivity; their electronic structure was (and would remain!) unclear. In 2000, Bertrand would obtain additional carbenes of the phosphanyl type, including (phosphanyl)(trifluoromethyl)carbene, stable in solution at -30 °C.

In 1991, Arduengo and coworkers obtained the first crystalline diaminocarbene by deprotonation of an imidazolium cation:

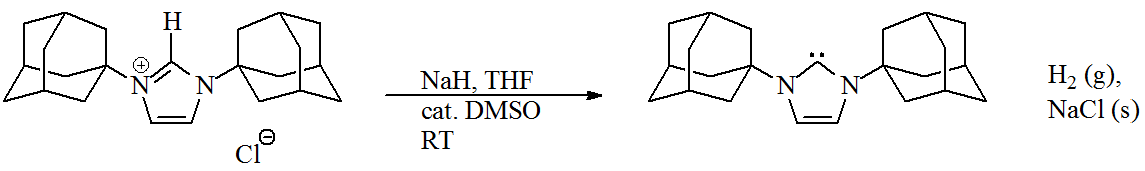
Preparation of N,N′-diadamantyl-imidazol-2-ylidene

This carbene, heralding a large family of carbenes with the imidazol-2-ylidene core, is indefinitely stable at room temperature in the absence of oxygen and moisture, and melts at 240–241 °C without decomposition.

The first air-stable Arduengo carbene, a chlorinated member of the imidazol-2-ylidene family, was obtained in 1997.

=== New examples and new theory ===
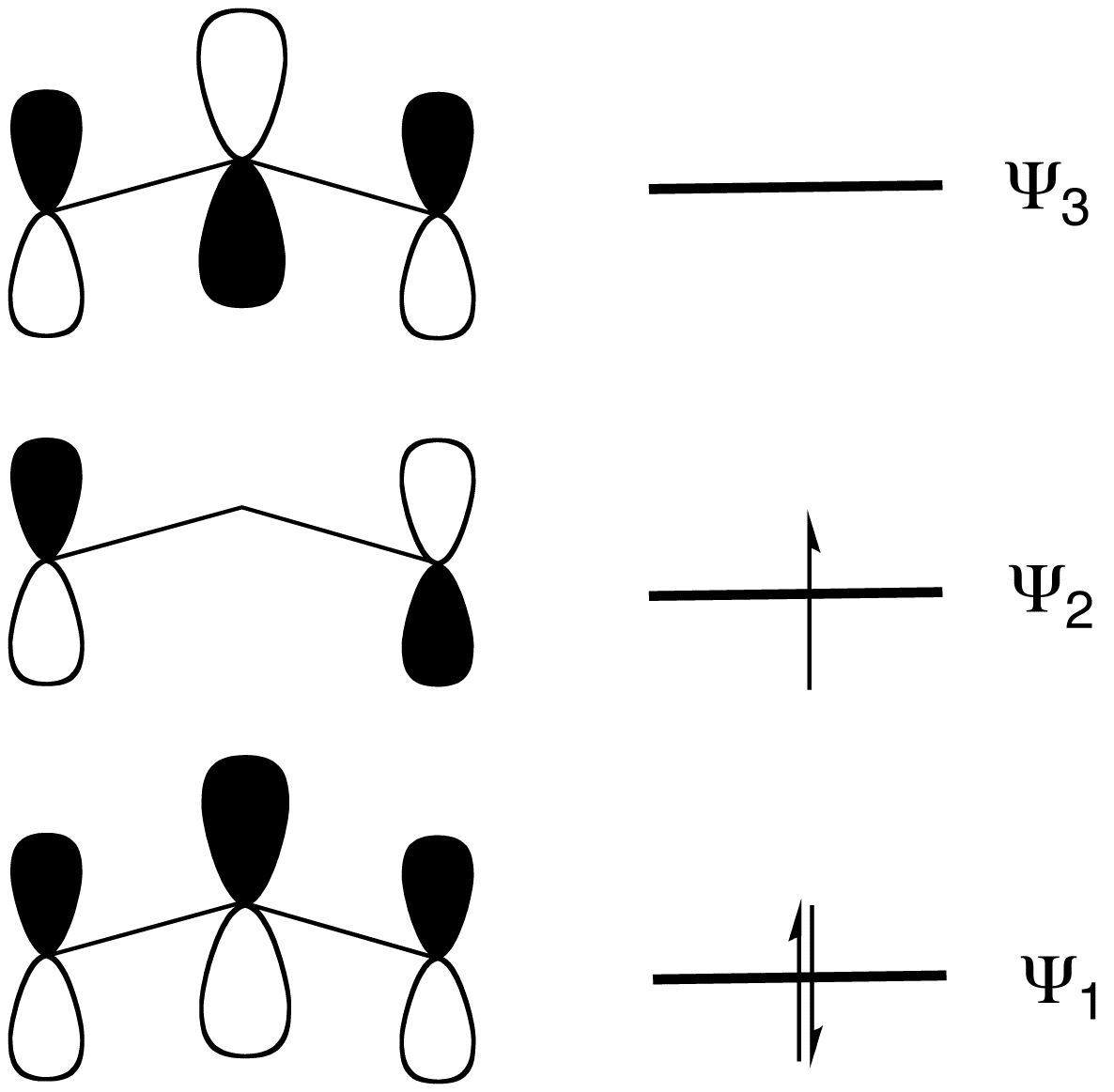
MO's of the allylic system.

In the modern understanding, the superficially unoccupied p-orbital on a stable carbene is not, in fact, fully empty. Instead, the carbene Lewis structures are in resonance with dative bonds toward adjacent lone-pair or π bond orbitals.

That persistent carbenes have ylidic character is hardly obvious, and indeed was initially contradicted. The X-ray structure of N,N′-diadamantyl-imidazol-2-ylidene revealed longer N–C bond lengths in the ring of the carbene than in the parent imidazolium compound, suggesting very little double bond character to these bonds. Hence early workers attributed the stability of Arduengo carbenes to the bulky N-adamantyl substituents, which prevent reaction with other molecules.

However, replacement of the N-adamantyl groups with methyl groups also affords 1,3,4,5-tetramethylimidazol-2‑ylidene (Me_{4}ImC:), a thermodynamically stable unhindered NHC (3D):

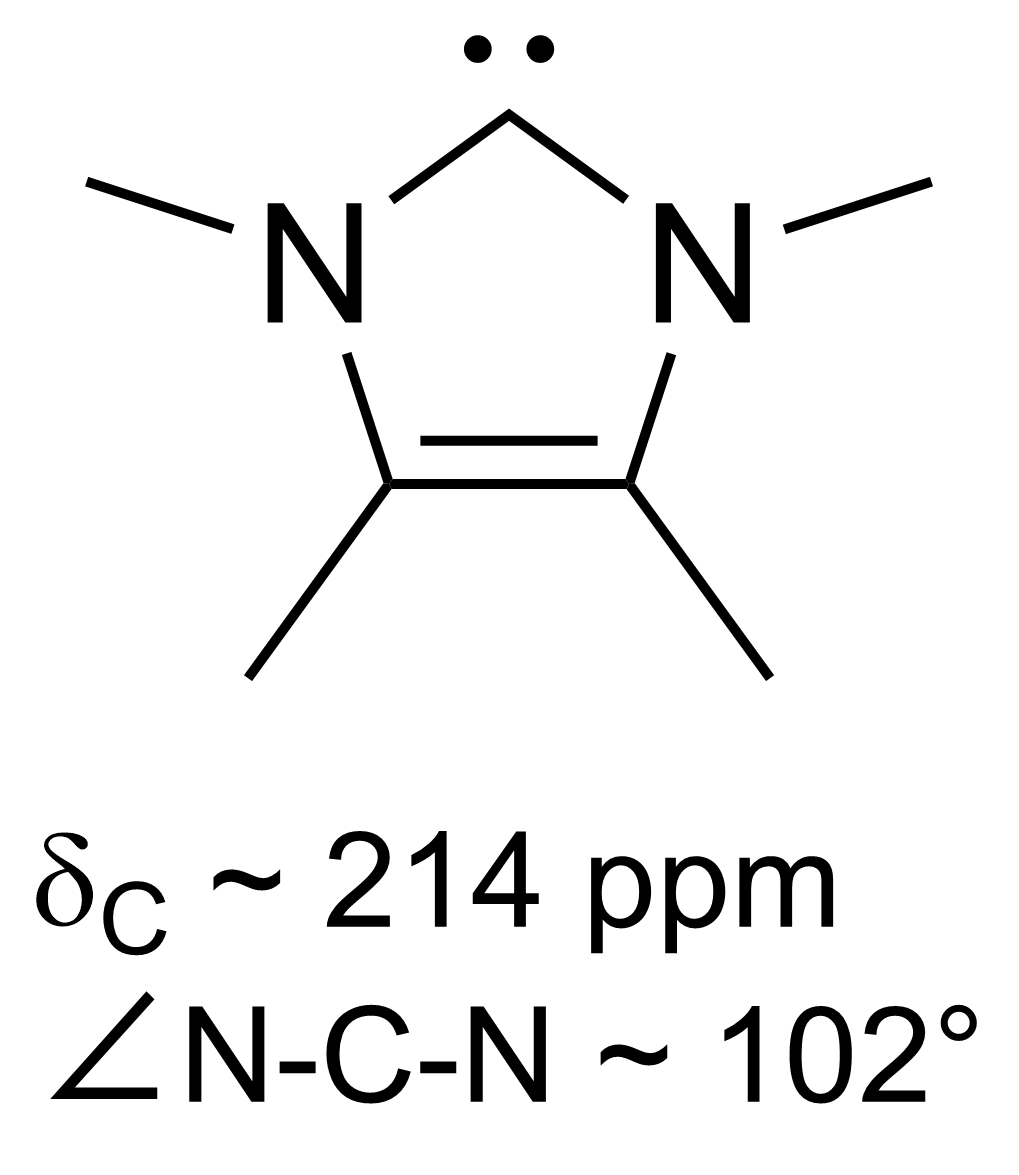
1,3,4,5-tetramethylimidazol-2-ylidene, a relatively unhindered carbene.

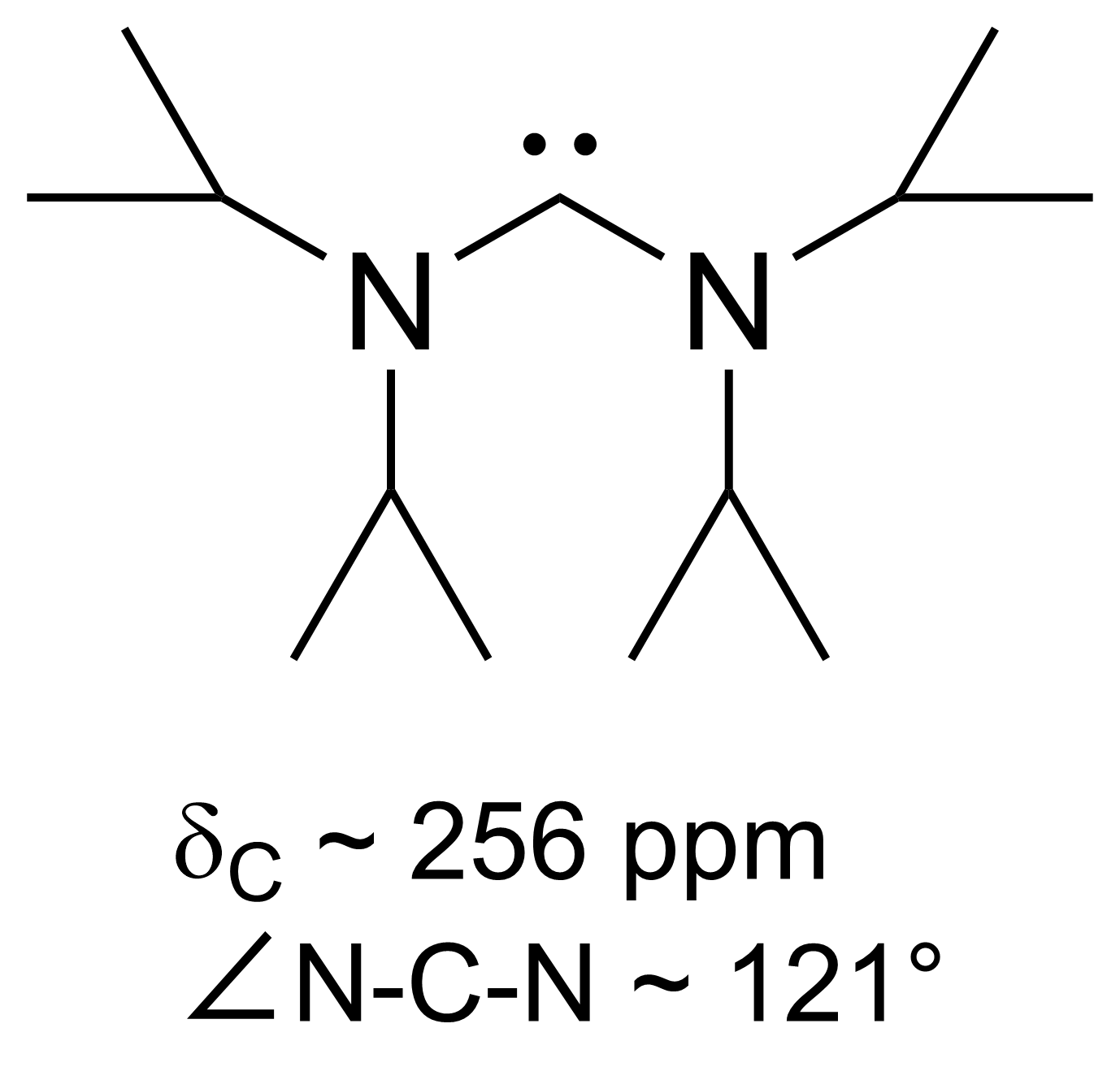
Bis(diisopropylamino) carbene, the first acyclic stable carbene.

In 1995, Arduengo's group obtained a carbene derivative of dihydroimidazol-2-ylidene, proving that stability did not arise from the aromaticity of the conjugated imidazole backbone. The following year, the first acyclic persistent carbene demonstrated that stability did not require even cyclicity.

Unhindered derivatives of the hydrogenated and acyclic carbenes dimerize over time, but proved key to resolving the electronic structure. Acyclic carbenes are flexible and bonds to the carbenic atom admit rotation. But bond rotation in the compound appeared hindered, suggesting that they did indeed have a double bond character.

Subsequent research has focused on expanding the array of heteroatoms stabilizing the ylide.

Most persistent carbenes are stabilized by two flanking nitrogen centers. The outliers include an aminothiocarbene and an aminooxycarbene (3D)...

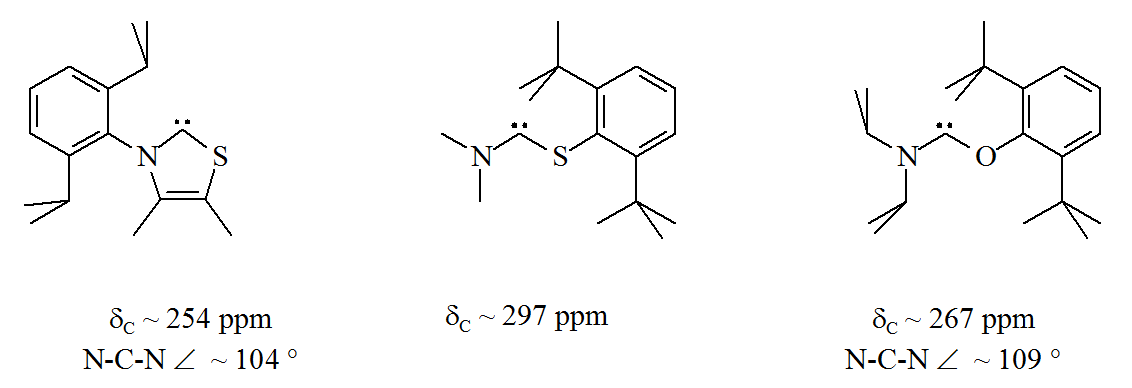
Stable carbenes with oxygen or sulfur atoms bound to the carbenic atom

...and room-temperature-stable bis(diisopropylamino)cyclopropenylidene, in which the amines are connected through vinylogy. In 2000, Bertrand obtained a moderately stable (amino)(aryl)carbene with only one heteroatom adjacent to the carbenic atom.

== Classes of stable carbenes ==
Stable carbenes rely on adjacent heteroatoms to stabilize the "carbenic" carbon. Stable carbenes can be usefully categorized by the number of such atoms that are nitrogen.

Carbenes that formally derive from imidazol-2-ylidenes by substitution of sulfur, oxygen, or other chalcogens for both α-nitrogens are expected to be unstable, as they have the potential to dissociate into an alkyne (R^{1}C≡CR^{2}) and a carbon dichalcogenide (X^{1}=C=X^{2}). Evidence for the reverse process exists: carbon disulfide (CS_{2}) reacts with electron-deficient acetylene derivatives to conjecturally give transient 1,3-dithiolium carbenes (i.e. where X^{1} = X^{2} = S), which then dimerise to tetrathiafulvene derivatives.

=== Diaminocarbenes ===
A wide variety of bisazomethine ylides are known, both cyclic and acylic:

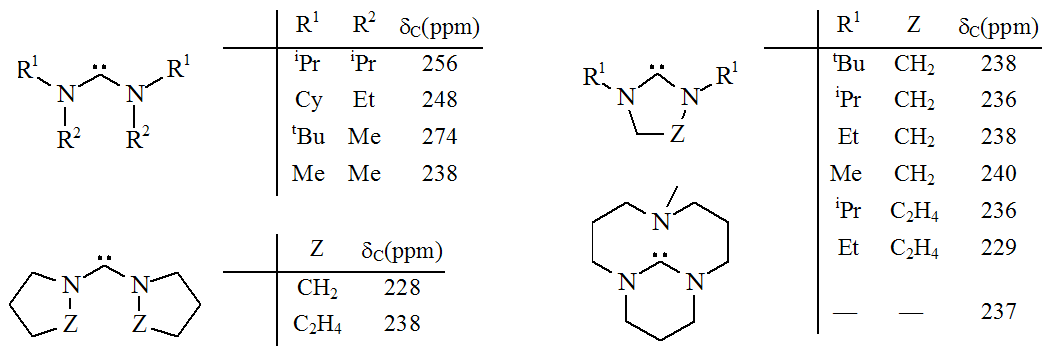
Some saturated metastable diaminocarbenes

The most useful such carbenes are aromatic, for otherwise the Wanzlick equilibrium favors dimerization.

Typically, they are derived from imidazole or triazole rings. However, one stable N-heterocyclic carbene derives from borazine:

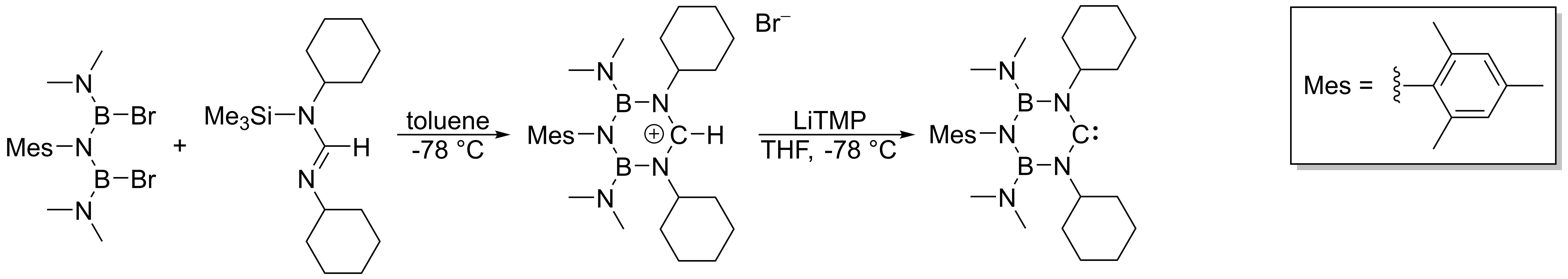

==== Imidazol-2-ylidenes ====
Imidazol-2-ylidenes are known with alkyl, aryl, alkyloxy, alkylamino, alkylphosphino and even chiral substituents on the nitrogen atoms.

1,3-Dimesityl-4,5-dichloroimidazol-2-ylidene, the first air-stable carbene, bears two chlorine atoms on the "backbone" (3D):

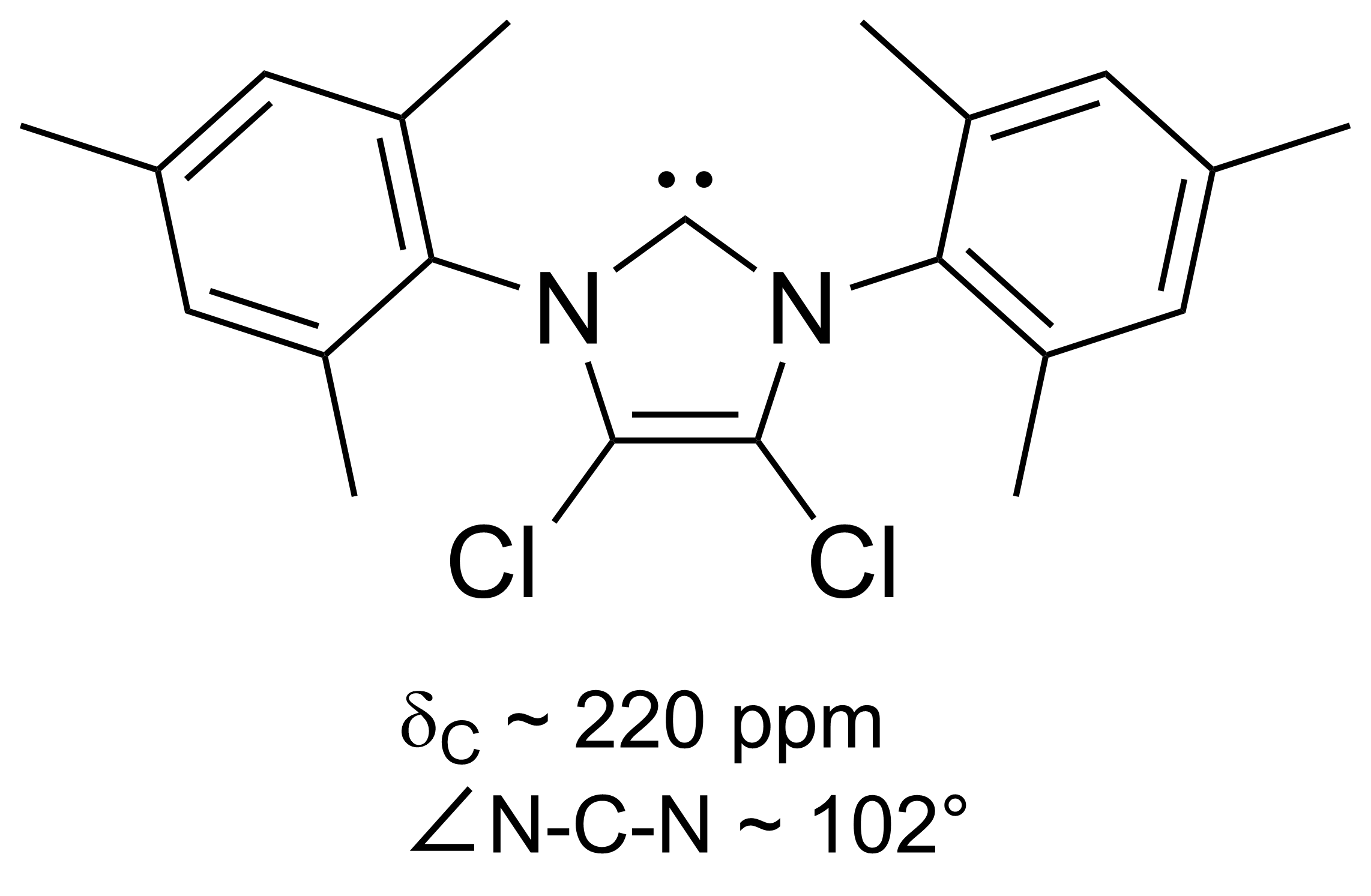

The chlorines likely reduce the electron density on the carbenic/ylidic carbon via induction through the σ system.

Because imidazolylidenes are stable against dimerization, molecules can contain multiple imidazol-2-ylidene groups:

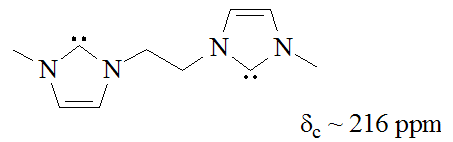

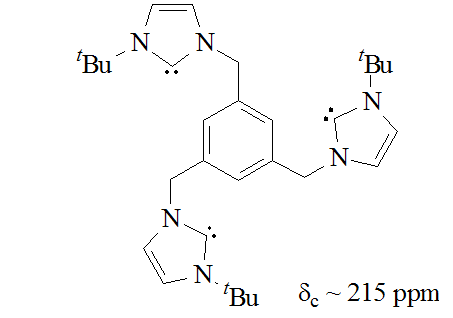

==== Triazol-5-ylidenes ====
In principle, triazol-5-ylidenes occur in two isomeric families, the 1,2,3-triazol-5-ylidenes and 1,2,4-triazol-5-ylidenes:

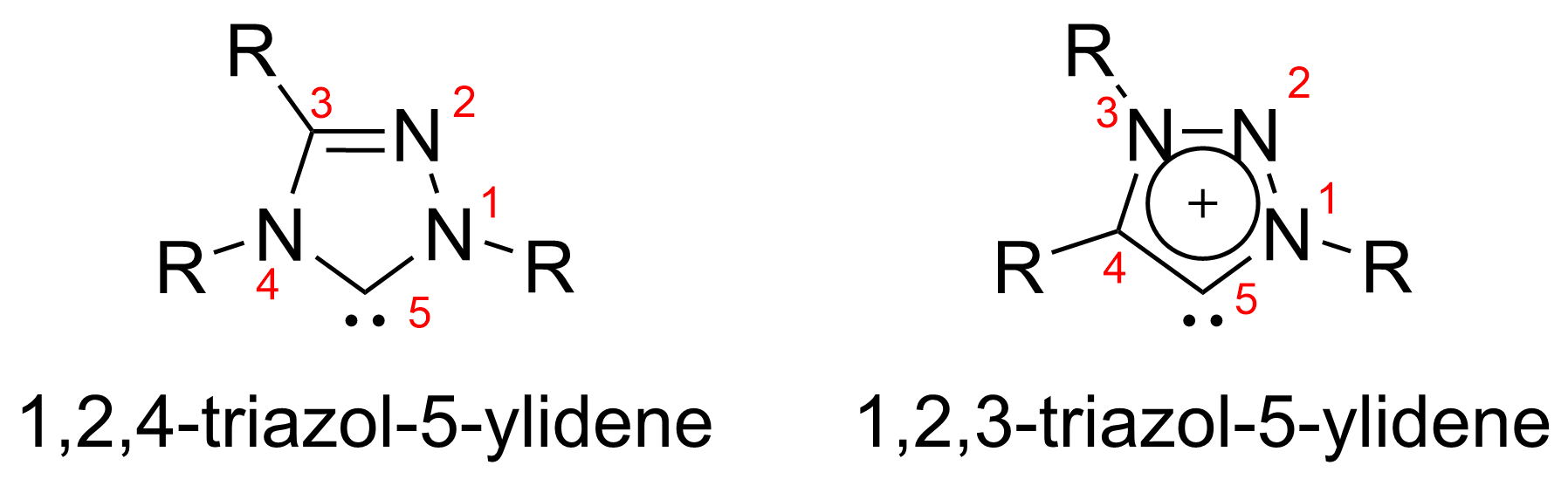
Triazol-5-ylidene isomers.

Few such carbenes have been reported, but a triphenyl molecule is commercially available:

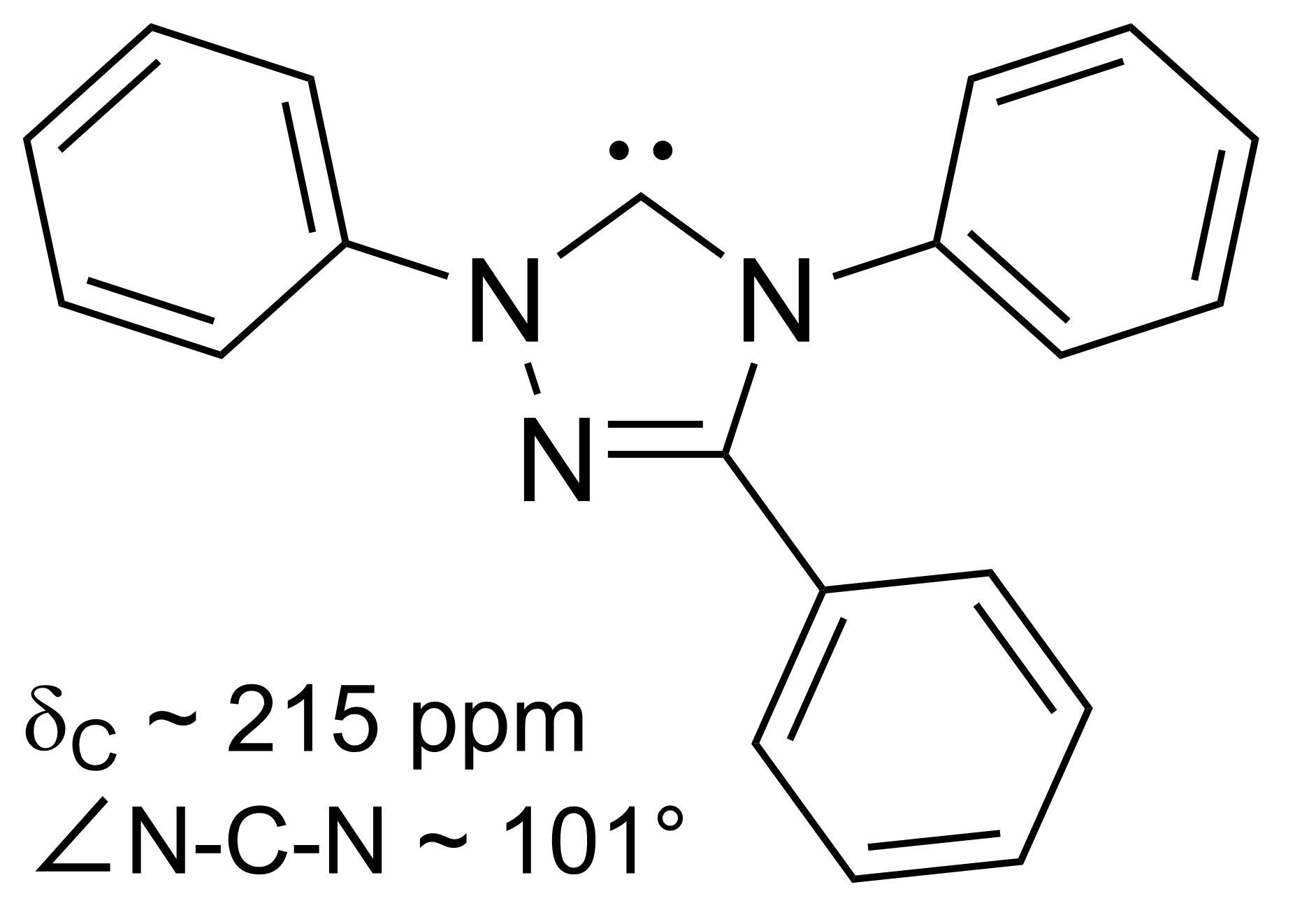
Commercial 1,2,4-triazol-5-ylidene.

=== Monoaminocarbenes ===
The non-nitrogen atom adjacent to the carbene may be carbon (the cyclic monoamino carbenes), oxygen, sulfur, or phosphorus:

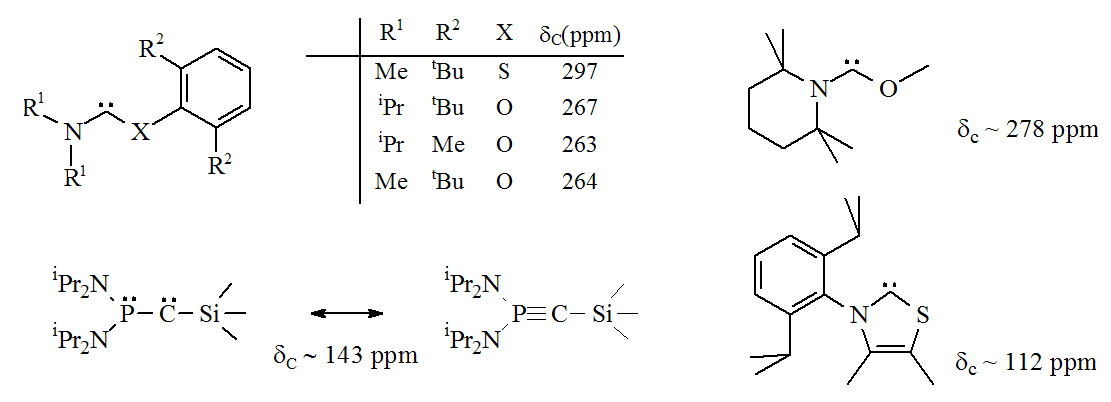
Synthesised heteroamino carbenes (top and bottom right) and Bertrand's carbenes (bottom left)

Since oxygen and sulfur are divalent, steric protection of the carbenic centre is particularly limited.

A claimed isothiazole carbene (2b) is not stable, rearranging instead to a β‑thiolactam:

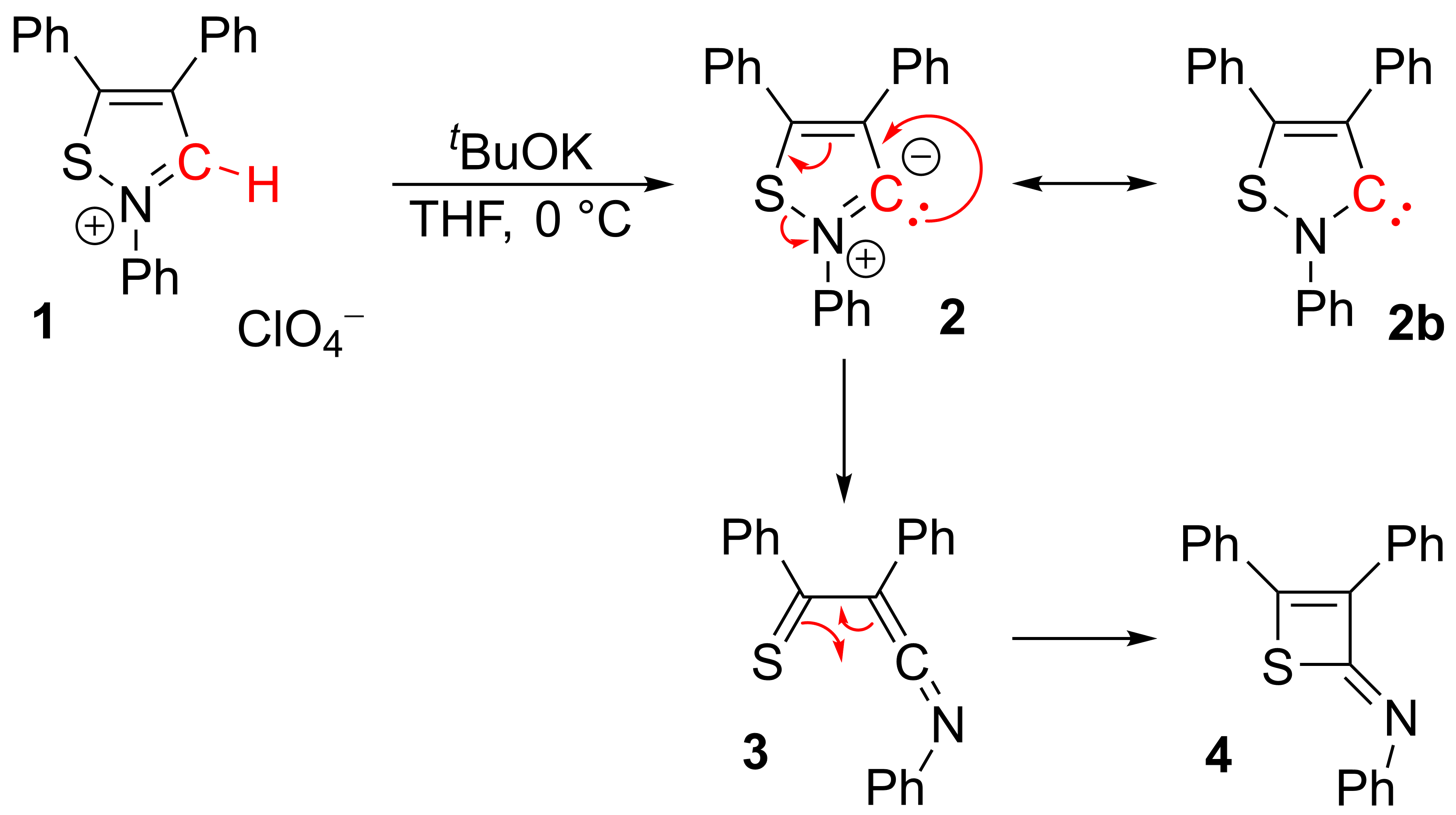

=== Cyclopropenylidenes ===
Another family of carbenes is based on a cyclopropenylidene core, a three-carbon ring with a double bond between the two atoms adjacent to the carbenic one. This family is exemplified by bis(diisopropylamino)cyclopropenylidene.

=== Bertrand's carbenes ===
In Bertrand's persistent carbenes, the unsaturated carbon is bonded to a phosphorus and a silicon. However, these compounds exhibit some alkynic properties and may instead be a hypervalent phosphaalkyne. The exact nature of these red oils remained unclear as of 2006.

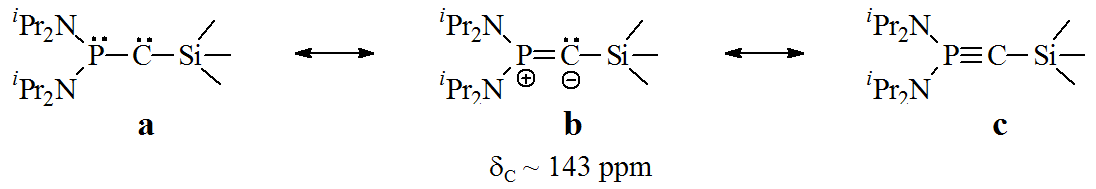
Alkyne and carbene resonances structures of Bertrand's carbene

=== Triplet state carbenes ===
Persistent carbenes tend to exist in the singlet, dimerizing when forced into triplet states. Nevertheless, Hideo Tomioka and associates used electron delocalization to produce a comparatively stable triplet carbene (bis(9-anthryl)carbene) in 2001. It has an unusually long half-life of 19 minutes. Metal (Pb, Pd, Pt) substituted triplet carbenes (metalla-carbenes) are only stable in the cold.[10][11]

Delocalization in a stable triplet carbene reported by Tomioka (2001). Note that the molecule is not planar; each arene system forms a plane perpendicular to the other

In 2006 a triplet carbene was reported by the same group with a half-life of 40 minutes. This carbene is prepared by a photochemical decomposition of a diazomethane precursor by 300 nm light in benzene with expulsion of nitrogen gas.

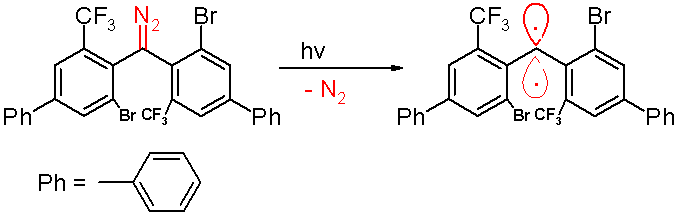
A persistent triplet carbene (right), synthesized by Itoh (2006). Note that the molecule is neither bent at the central carbon nor planar; that carbon is sp hybridized and each arene system forms a plane perpendicular to the other

Exposure to oxygen (a triplet diradical) converts this carbene to the corresponding benzophenone. A diphenylmethane compound is formed when it is trapped by cyclohexa-1,4-diene.

As with the other carbenes, this species contains large bulky substituents, namely bromine and the trifluoromethyl groups on the phenyl rings, that shield the carbene and prevent or slow down the process of dimerization to a 1,1,2,2-tetra(phenyl)alkene. Based on computer simulations, the distance of the divalent carbon atom to its neighbors is claimed to be 138 picometers with a bond angle of 158.8°. The planes of the phenyl groups are almost at right angles to each other (the dihedral angle being 85.7°).

=== Mesoionic carbenes ===
Mesoionic carbenes (MICs) are similar to N-heterocyclic carbenes (NHCs), except that canonical resonance structures with the carbene depicted cannot be drawn without adding additional charges. Mesoionic carbenes are also referred to as abnormal N-heterocyclic carbenes (aNHC) or remote N-heterocyclic carbenes (rNHC).

== Chemical properties ==
Enders et al. have performed a range of organic reactions involving a model triazol-5-ylidene:

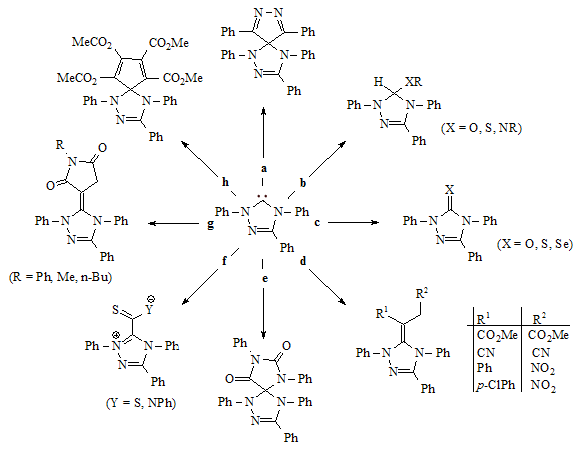
Reactions of triazol-5-ylidene: a / 3,6-diphenyl-1,2,4,5-tetrazine, toluene / 92% / e / 2 equiv., PhNCO, toluene, reflux / 92%; b / RXH, RT / 95–97% / f / CS_{2}, toluene, or PhNCS, THF, RT / 71–90%; c / O_{2}, S_{8}, or Se, toluene, reflux / 54–68% / g / Maleimide, THF, RT / 47–84%; d / R_{1}CH=CHR^{2}, THF, RT / 25–68% / h / Dimethylacetylene dicarboxylate, THF, reflux / 21%

The unprotonated molecule performed nucleophilic addition (e and f), possibly in conjugate (d, g and h). As a base, it abstracts labile protons easily; the resulting cation can easily add a nucleophile (a net insertion reaction; b). Chalcogens add at the carbene to recover the (thio)urea (c) and activated dienes add the carbene in [4+1] cycloadditions (a).

=== Basicity and nucleophilicity ===
The imidazol-2-ylidenes are strong bases, having conjugate pK_{a} ≈ 24 in dimethyl sulfoxide (DMSO):

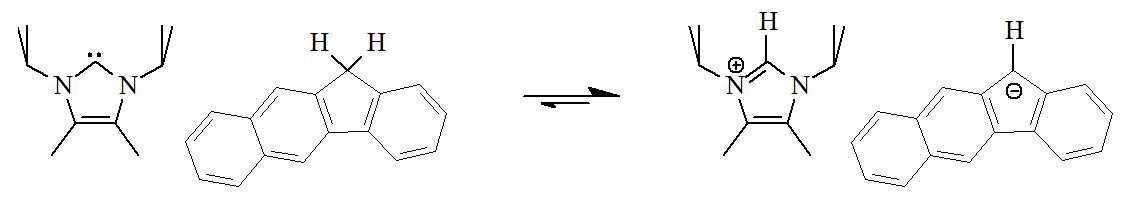
Measurement of the pKa value for the conjugate acid of an imidazol-2-ylidene

Conjugate pK_{a} values for several NHC families have been examined in aqueous solution. pK_{a} values of triazolium ions lie in the range 16.5–17.8, around 3 pK_{a} units more acidic than related imidazolium ions. Contrariwise, diaminocarbenes will deprotonate DMSO solvent, with the resulting anion reacting with the resulting amidinium salt:

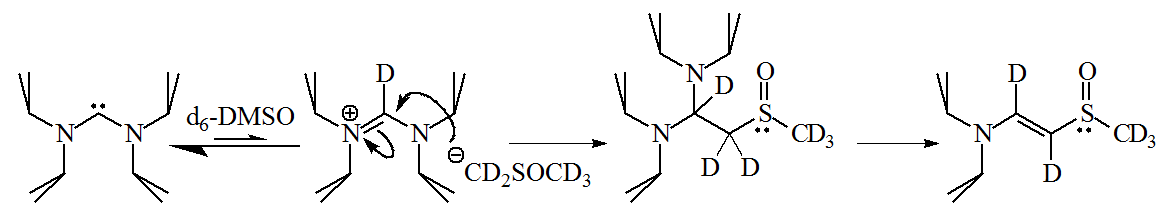
Using D6-DMSO as an NMR solvent can have unexpected results.

The molecules are likely also reasonably nucleophilic. Reaction of imidazol-2-ylidenes with 1-bromohexane gave 90% of the 2-substituted adduct, with only 10% of the corresponding alkene.

Stable carbenes derived from thiazole underlie the action of thiamine in biological systems, and its biomimetic descendant, the Stetter reaction.

=== Dimerisation ===
At one time, stable carbenes were thought to reversibly dimerise through the so-called Wanzlick equilibrium. The uncatalyzed reaction is typically slow, presumably in part because direct, planar dimerization (A) requires first crossing the high singlet-triplet barrier. In the preferred pathway (B), the empty carbon p orbital attacks a nearby carbene lone pair:

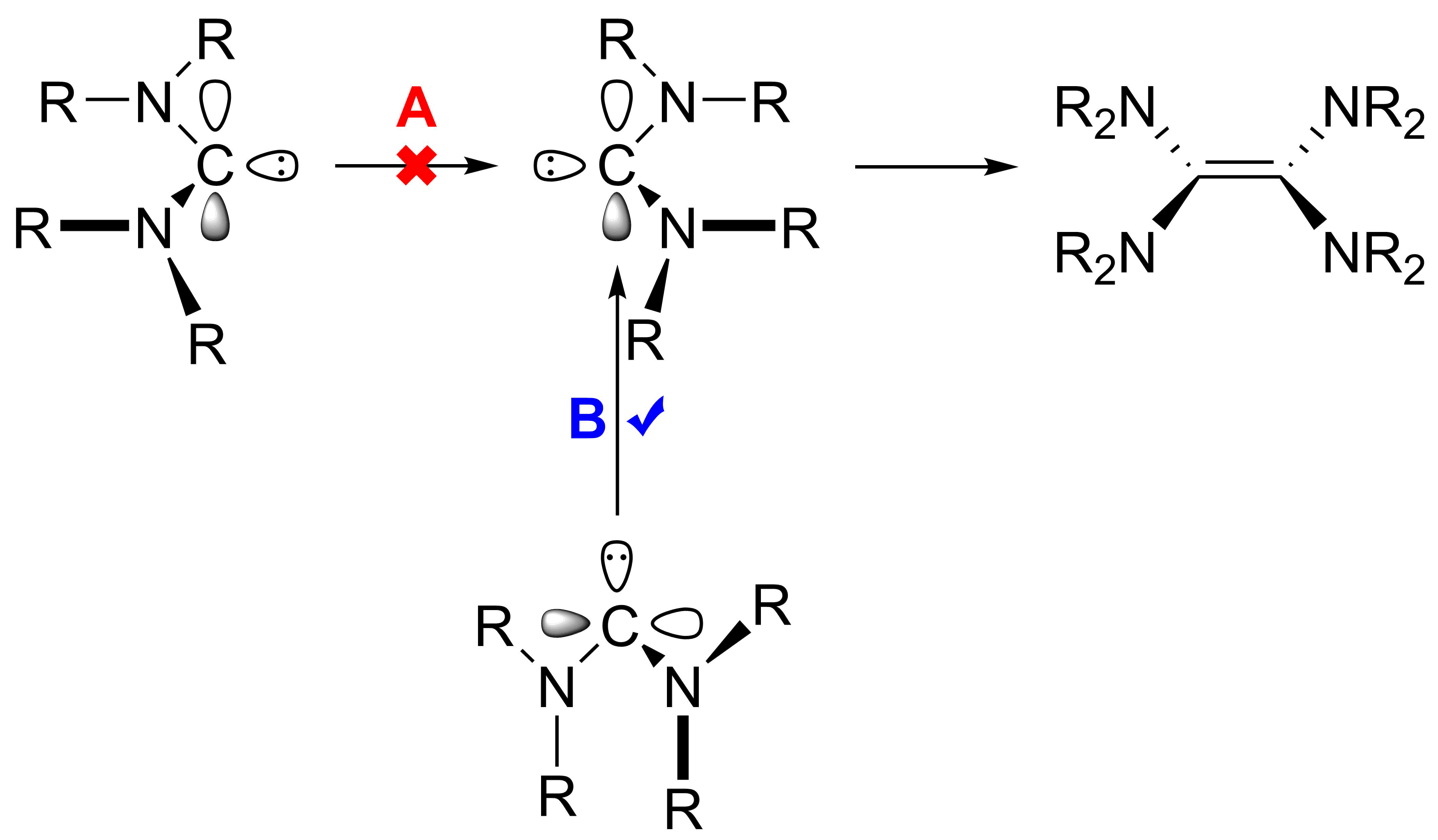

Protons, which create formamidinium salts, catalyze the reaction, as do other Lewis acids.

However, imidazol-2-ylidenes and triazol-5-ylidenes are thermodynamically stable and do not dimerise even under relatively forcing conditions. They have been stored in solution in the absence of water and air for years. This is presumably due to the aromatic nature of these carbenes, which is lost upon dimerisation.

Chen and Taton demonstrated that a sufficiently short tether (i.e., propylene, but not butylene) could force aromatic stable carbenes to dimerize:

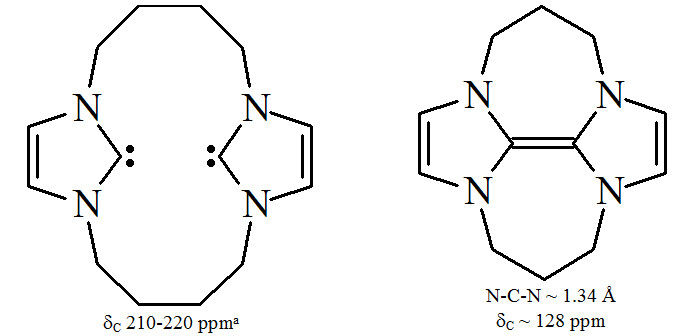
Dimerisation of tethered diimidazol-2-ylidenes

If a dicarbene, the carbenic lone pairs would be forced into close proximity. To avoid electrostatic repulsion between the lone pairs, the orbitals hybridize into bonds.

=== Metal complexes ===
Imidazol-2-ylidenes, triazol-5-ylidenes (and less so, diaminocarbenes) coordinate to a plethora of elements: from main group elements, transition metals and actinides to even alkali metals and lanthanides. A periodic table of elements gives some idea of the complexes which have been prepared.

Periodic table: Persistent carbene
Group →	1	2		3	4	5	6	7	8	9	10	11	12	13	14	15	16	17	18
↓ Period
1	1 H																		2 He
2	3 Li	4 Be												5 B	6 C	7 N	8 O	9 F	10; Ne
3	11; Na	12; Mg												13; Al	14; Si	15; P	16; S	17; Cl	18; Ar
4	19; K	20; Ca		21; Sc	22; Ti	23; V	24; Cr	25; Mn	26; Fe	27; Co	28; Ni	29; Cu	30; Zn	31; Ga	32; Ge	33; As	34; Se	35; Br	36; Kr
5	37; Rb	38; Sr		39; Y	40; Zr	41; Nb	42; Mo	43; Tc	44; Ru	45; Rh	46; Pd	47; Ag	48; Cd	49; In	50; Sn	51; Sb	52; Te	53; I	54; Xe
6	55; Cs	56; Ba	1 asterisk	71; Lu	72; Hf	73; Ta	74; W	75; Re	76; Os	77; Ir	78; Pt	79; Au	80; Hg	81; Tl	82; Pb	83; Bi	84; Po	85; At	86; Rn
7	87; Fr	88; Ra	2 asterisks	103; Lr	104; Rf	105; Db	106; Sg	107; Bh	108; Hs	109; Mt	110; Ds	111; Rg	112; Cn	113; Nh	114; Fl	115; Mc	116; Lv	117; Ts	118; Og
1 asterisk				57; La	58; Ce	59; Pr	60; Nd	61; Pm	62; Sm	63; Eu	64; Gd	65; Tb	66; Dy	67; Ho	68; Er	69; Tm	70; Yb
2 asterisks				89; Ac	90; Th	91; Pa	92; U	93; Np	94; Pu	95; Am	96; Cm	97; Bk	98; Cf	99; Es	100; Fm	101; Md	102; No

Legend
Carbene complex with element known
No carbene complex with element known

In many cases, the complexes have been identified by single crystal X-ray crystallography. Stable carbenes are roughly isolobal with organophosphines. The carbenic lone pair is a good σ donor, and the adjacent, stabilizing heteroatoms enrich the π system with such electrons as to inhibit π backbonding. Enders and Hermann have shown ligand rough equivalence between stable carbenes and organophosphines in several catalytic cycles: the carbenes do not activate the metal near so much, but the resulting complexes are far more robust. Grubbs has reported replacing a phosphine ligand (PCy_{3}) with an imidazol-2-ylidene in the olefin metathesis catalyst RuCl_{2}(PCy_{3})_{2}CHPh, and noted increased ring closing metathesis as well as exhibiting "a remarkable air and water stability".

Molecules containing two and three carbene moieties have been prepared as potential bidentate and tridentate carbene ligands.

== Physical properties ==
Those carbenes that have been isolated to date tend to be colorless solids with low melting points. These carbenes tend to sublime at low temperatures under high vacuum.

X-ray structures of imidazolic carbenes show N–C–N bond angles of 103–110°, but typically 104°. Nonaromatic carbenes typically exhibit larger angles: dihydroimidazole-2-ylidene shows a N–C–N bond angle of about 106°, whilst the angle of an acyclic carbene is 121°. Contrariwise, monoamino carbenes X-ray structures have shown N–C–X bond angles of around 104° and 109° respectively.

=== NMR ===
One of the more useful physical properties is the diagnostic chemical shift of the carbenic carbon atom in the ^{13}C-NMR spectrum. Typically this peak is in the range between 200 and 300 ppm, where few other peaks appear in the ^{13}C-NMR spectrum. For example, bis(isopropyl)imidazolidinylidene exhibits a peak at 238 ppm:

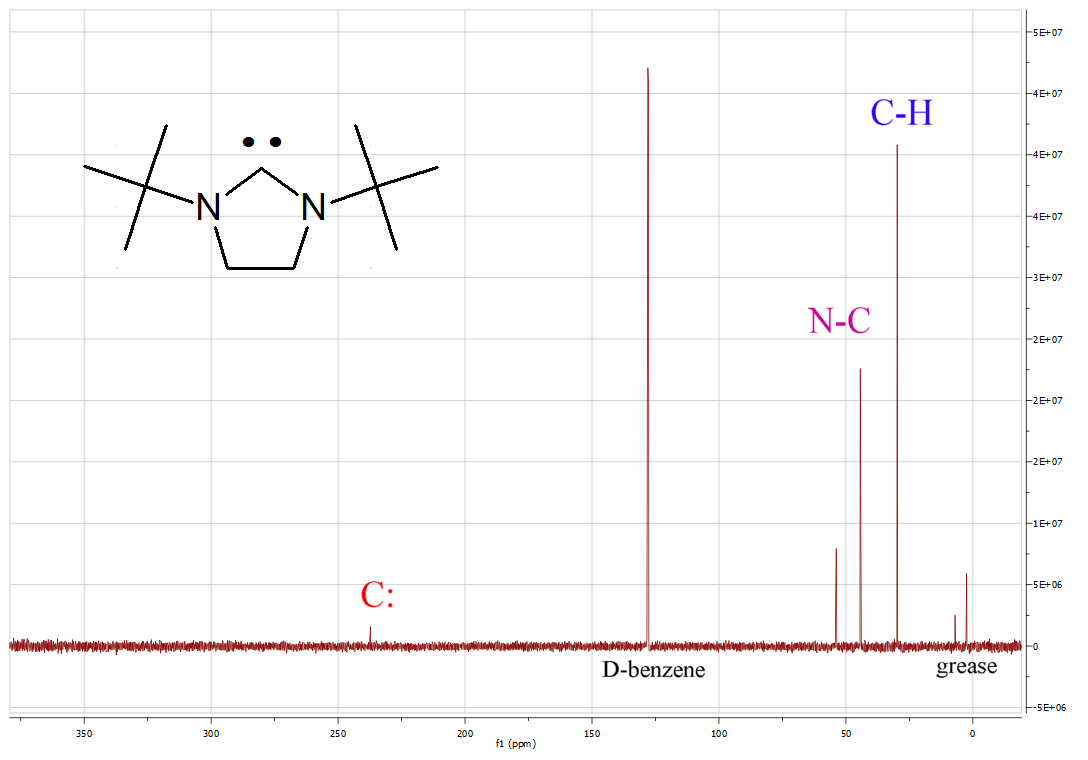
Carbene peak in ^{13}C NMR

Imidazole-based carbenes generally have diagnostic ^{13}C NMR chemical shift values between 210 and 230 ppm for the carbenic carbon:

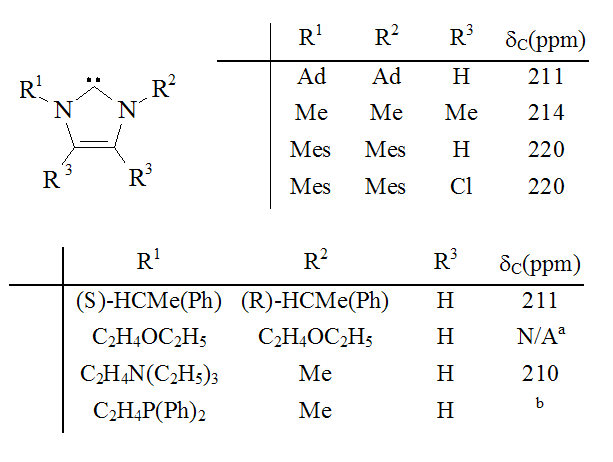
Stable imidazol-2-ylidenes

Triazole-based carbenes have shifts between 210 and 220 ppm, while nonaromatic diaminocarbenes have shifts between 230 and 270 ppm (see diagram). Acyclic, monoamino carbenes have shifts between 250 and 300 ppm for the carbenic carbon, further downfield than any other table carbene.

Upon coordination to metal centers, the ^{13}C carbene resonance usually shifts highfield, depending on the Lewis acidity of the complex fragment. Based on this observation, Huynh et al. developed a new methodology to determine ligand donor strengths by ^{13}C NMR analysis of trans-palladium(II)-carbene complexes. The use of a ^{13}C-labeled N-heterocyclic carbene ligand also allows for the study of mixed carbene-phosphine complexes, which undergo trans-cis-isomerization due to the trans effect.

== Aspirational applications ==
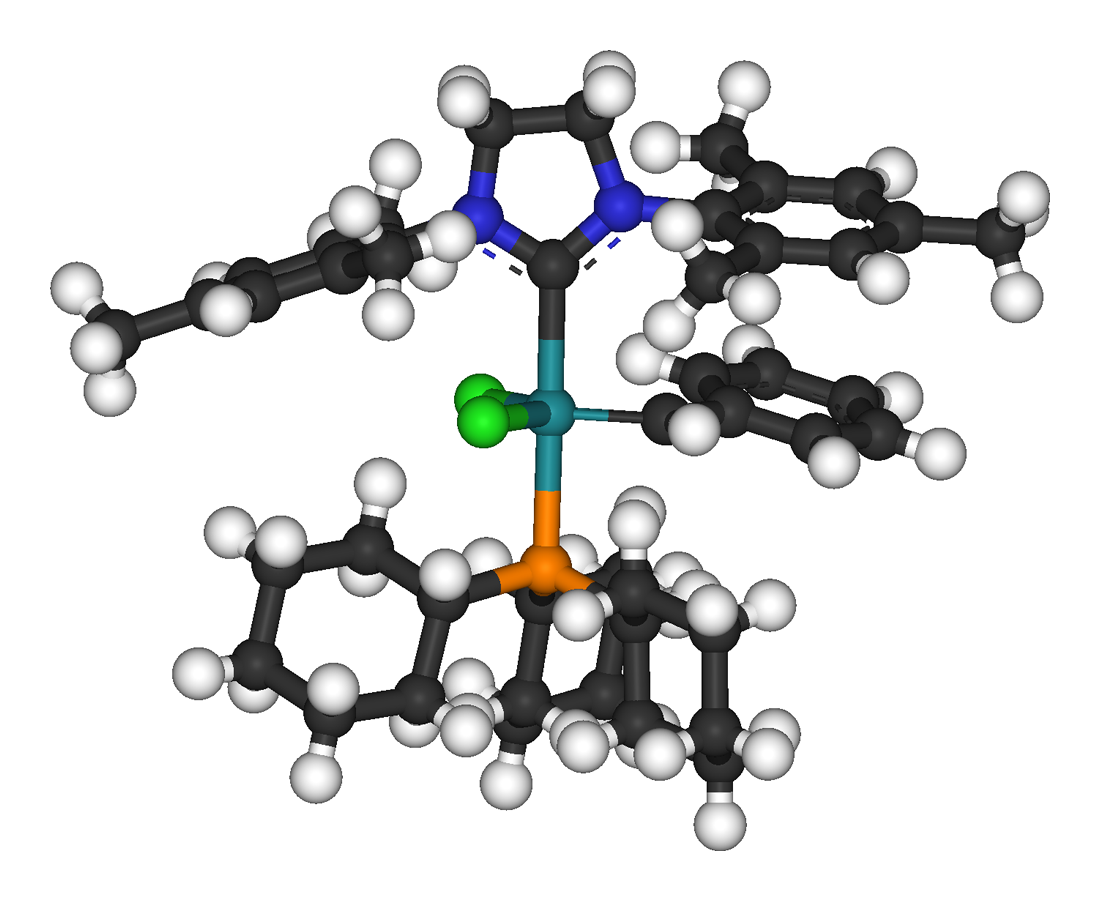
A second generation Grubbs' catalyst.

In academia, NHCs are widely-used ancillary ligands. They are components of the ruthenium-based Grubbs' catalyst for olefin metathesis, which have been intensively investigated. NHC-Palladium Complexes catalyze cross-coupling reactions.

Ag(I)-NHC complexes have been widely tested for their biological applications.

== Preparation methods ==
NHCs are often strongly basic (the pKa value of the conjugate acid of an imidazol-2-ylidene was measured at ca. 24) and react with oxygen. Their synthesis, then must be performed free of air and compounds of even moderate acidity. Conversely, provided rigorously dry, relatively non-acidic and air-free materials are used, stable carbenes are reasonably robust to handling per se.

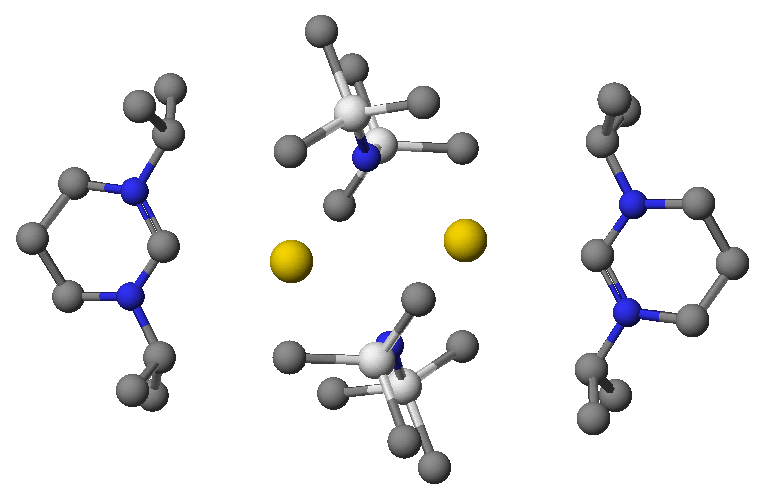
X-ray structure of a KHMDS-diaminocarbene complex, formed when excess KHMDS was used to deprotonate the parent formamidinium salt.

The simplest syntheses deprotonate a parent salt, but the byproducts can be difficult to separate out, because NHCs coordinate strongly to even alkali metal cations. Potassium and sodium salts tend to precipitate from solution and can be removed, but lithium ions are especially problematic, requiring cryptands or crown ethers.

Alternate techniques have been developed to avoid such purification difficulties.

=== Deprotonation ===
Deprotonation of carbene precursor salts with strong bases reliably produces almost all stable carbenes:

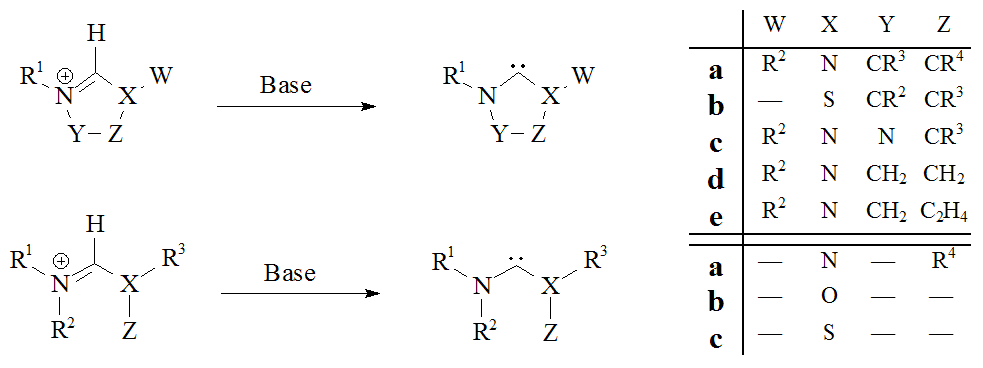
Deprotonation of precursor salts to give stable carbenes.

Imidazol-2-ylidenes and dihydroimidazol-2-ylidenes, such as IMes, have been prepared by the deprotonation of the respective imidazolium and imidazolinium salts. Acyclic carbenes and tetrahydropyrimidinyl-based carbenes were prepared by deprotonation using strong homogeneous bases.

However, the reaction depends on the correct choice of base. Although imidazolium salt precursors are stable to nucleophilic addition, other non-aromatic salts (i.e. formamidinium salts) are not. In these cases, strong unhindered nucleophiles are avoided whether they are generated in situ or are present as an impurity in other reagents (such as LiOH in BuLi).

Alkyllithiums are unreliable bases for the reaction, because they are too nucleophilic and often act as hydridic reductants:

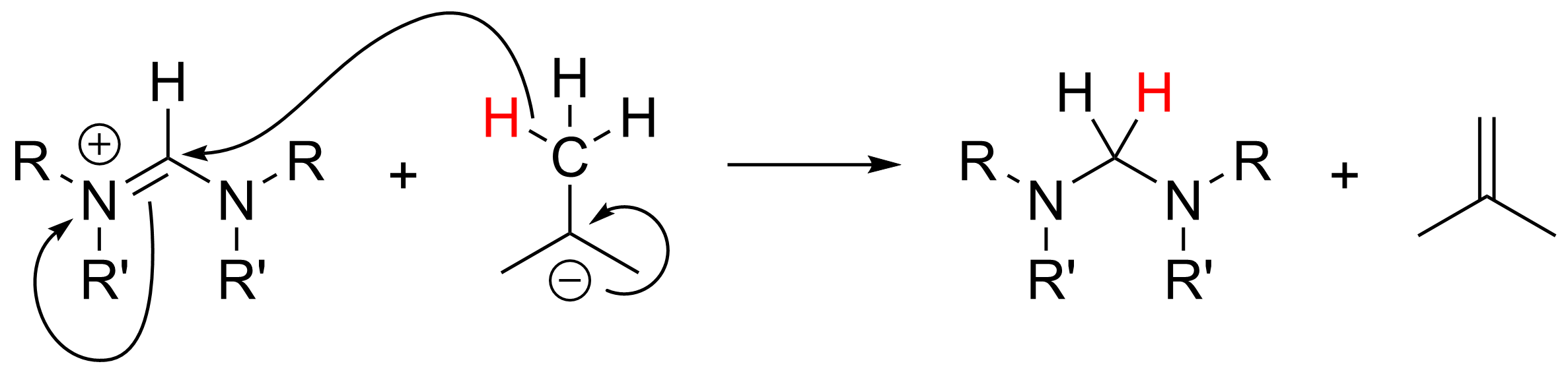
Reduction of formamidinium salts with tert-butyllithium

In principle, sodium or potassium hydride would be the ideal base for deprotonating these precursor salts, but in practice the salt dissolves too slowly for effective reaction. DMSO or t-BuOH catalyze the reaction through the soluble tert-butoxide or dimsyl anion bases, but those compounds are too nucleophilic for non-aromatic carbenes. Deprotonation with sodium or potassium hydride in a mixture of liquid ammonia/THF at −40 °C has been reported for imidazole-based carbenes, and Arduengo and coworkers managed to prepare a dihydroimidazol-2-ylidene using NaH. However, this method has not been applied to the preparation of diaminocarbenes.

In some cases, potassium tert-butoxide can be employed directly.

Lithium amides like the diisopropylamide (LDA) and tetramethylpiperidide (LiTMP) generally work well for the deprotonation of all types of salts, providing that not too much LiOH impurity is present. Metal hexamethyldisilazides deprotonate almost all salts cleanly, except for unhindered formamidinium salts, where this base can act as a nucleophile to give a triaminomethane adduct.

=== Dechalcogenation and dechlorination ===
For carbenes stable at elevated temperatures, a rare approach desulfurizes thioureas in THF with molten potassium:

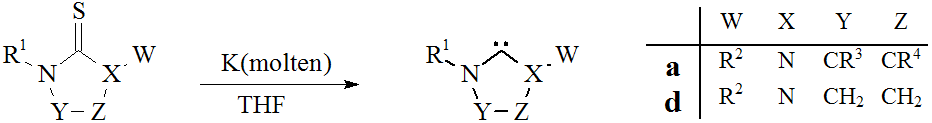

A contributing factor to the reaction's success is that the potassium sulfide byproduct is insoluble in the solvent.

A single example of deoxygenating a urea with a fluorene derived carbene to give the tetramethyldiaminocarbene and fluorenone has also been reported:

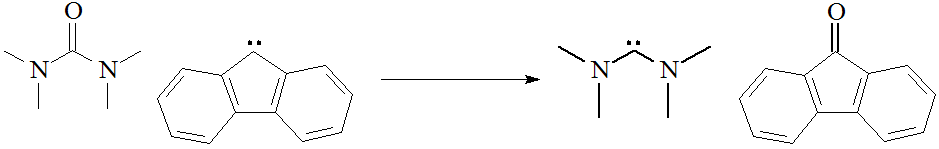

Bis(trimethylsilyl)mercury (CH_{3})_{3}Si-Hg-Si(CH_{3})_{3} reacts with chloro-iminium and chloro-amidinium salts to give a metal-free carbene and elemental mercury. For example:

(CH_{3})_{3}Si−Hg−Si(CH_{3})_{3} + R_{2}N=C(Cl)−NR^{+}_{2}Cl^{−} → R_{2}N−C−NR_{2} + Hg_{(l)} + 2(CH_{3})_{3}SiCl

=== Vacuum pyrolysis ===
Vacuum pyrolysis, with the removal of neutral volatile byproducts i.e. methanol or chloroform, has been used to prepare dihydroimidazole and triazole based carbenes. Historically the removal of chloroform by vacuum pyrolysis of adducts A was used by Wanzlick in his early attempts to prepare dihydroimidazol-2-ylidenes but this method is not widely used. The Enders laboratory has used vacuum pyrolysis of adduct B to generate a triazol-5-ylidene:

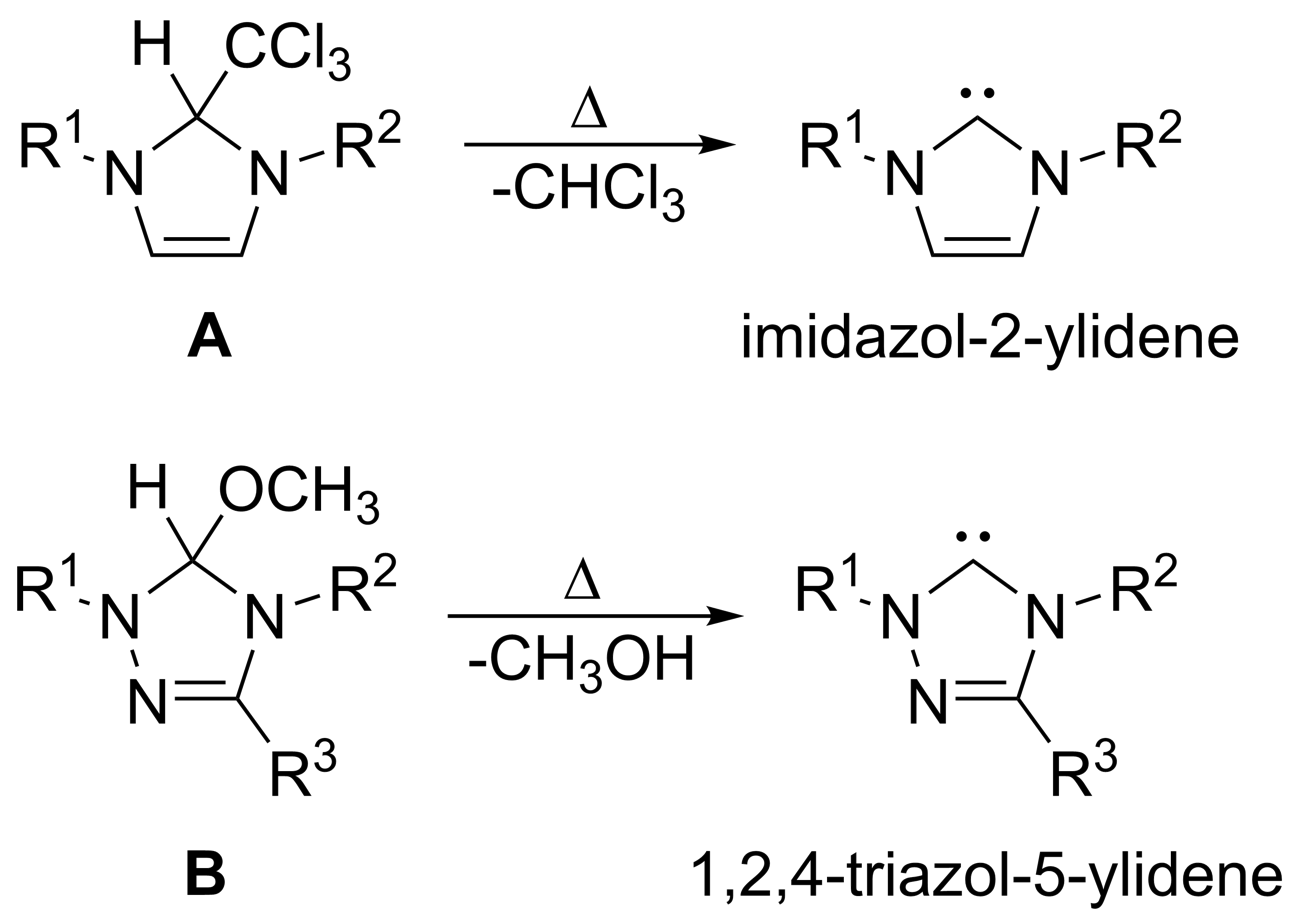
Preparation of carbenes via vacuum pyrolysis.

=== Purification ===
A stable carbene prepared from potassium hydride can be filtered through a dry celite pad to remove excess KH (and resulting salts) from the reaction. On a relatively small scale, a suspension containing a stable carbene in solution can be allowed to settle and the supernatant solution pushed through a dried membrane syringe filter.

Recrystallisation of stable carbenes is difficult, because stable carbenes are readily soluble in non-polar solvents, and polar solvents are insuitably acidic.

Air-free sublimation purifies effectively, even giving monocrystals suitable for X-ray analysis. However, strong complexation to metal ions like lithium will in most cases prevent sublimation. Also, the process must be performed at high vacuum, as persistent carbenes decompose above 60 °C.

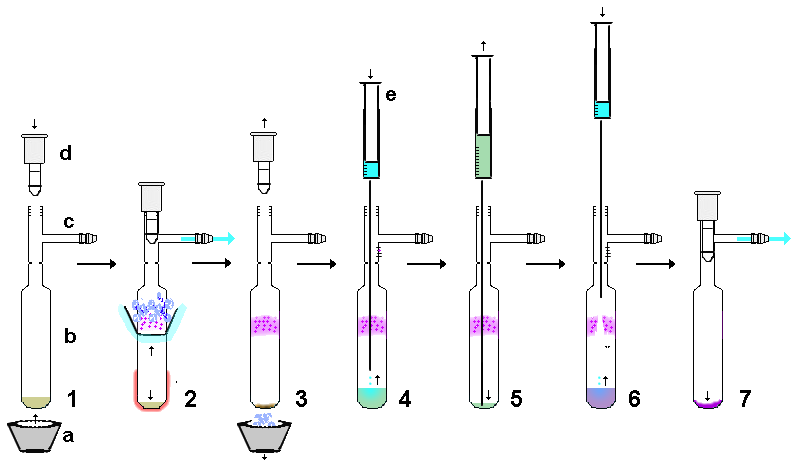
Apparatus: a Rubber cone (typically used to form a vacuum seal in a Büchner flask filtration) which is selected so as to fit snugly around the neck of the Schlenk tube b Schlenk tube c Gas/vacuum inlet d Teflon tap (or stopcock) e Syringe Method (steps 4 and 5 can be repeated as required; steps 6 and 7 are not essential): 1 Impure solid to sublime (brown) is placed in a Schlenk tube, avoiding contaminating the sides of the tube (e.g. by careful evaporation from a solution containing the brown solid). 2 Rubber cone (black) is pushed near top of the Schlenk tube (forming a tight seal around flask) and filled with a coolant such as dry ice/acetone (blue/white). The bottom of the Schlenk tube is heated (red shading) under vacuum (blue arrow), so that the impure solid (brown) sublimes as a pure solid (purple) at the cooled neck area (blue shading). 3 The flask is held under an atmosphere of an inert gas via Schlenk tube side arm, until step 7. The cooling-cone (black) is removed, leaving the concentrated impurity as a residue (dark brown) in the bottom of the flask, and the purified sublimed solid (purple) at the neck. 4 Solvent (blue) is inserted via syringe to dissolve the residue (green/brown), taking care to avoid washing off the sublimed solid (purple). 5 Residue solution is then removed by syringe (green/brown). 6 Purified sublimed solid (purple) is washed off the neck of the flask with fresh solvent (blue) via a syringe. 7 Solvent is removed under vacuum to give the purified sublimed solid (dark purple).
