= Triazol-5-ylidene =

Class of chemical compounds

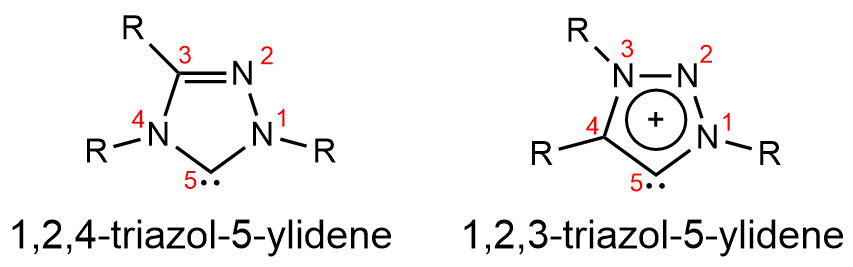
Triazol-5-ylidene constitutional isomers

The triazol-5-ylidenes are a group of persistent carbenes which includes the 1,2,4-triazol-5-ylidene system and the 1,2,3-triazol-5-ylidene system. As opposed to the now ubiquitous NHC (N-heterocyclic carbene) systems based on imidazole rings, these carbenes are structured from triazole rings. 1,2,4-triazol-5-ylidene can be thought of as an analog member of the NHC family, with an extra nitrogen in the ring, while 1,2,3-triazol-5-ylidene is better thought of as a mesoionic carbene (MIC). Both isomers of this group of carbenes benefit from enhanced stability, with certain examples exhibiting greater thermal stability, and others extended shelf life.

The 1,2,4-triazol-5-ylidene system is of special historic interest, as this system contains the first known instance of a characterized NHC, a compound colloquially known as Nitron, which was first isolated in 1905. This compound was first proposed as an analytical reagent for the gravimetric analysis of moieties commonly found in explosives. Nitron's properties as an NHC, however, were not reported and utilized until 2011.

Another member from this group of carbenes is of particular interest due to its robust stability up to temperatures of 150 °C in the absence of air or oxygen. It was first reported in 1995 by Dieter Enders and coworkers and has since become known as the "Ender's carbene." This particular reagent bears the notable distinction of being the first commercially available carbene.

== History and Synthesis ==
=== Nitron ===
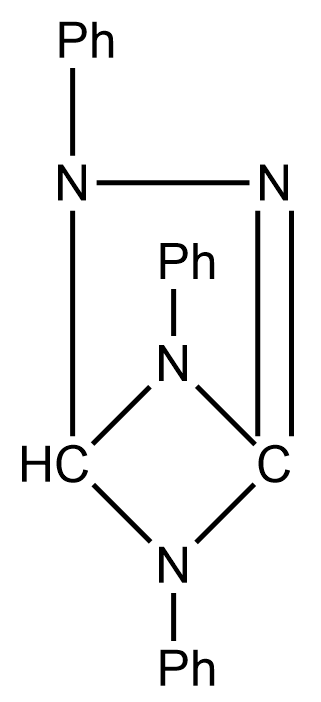
Proposed structure of Nitron c. 1917

Cope and Barab reported in 1917 that Nitron had been first synthesized as early as 1905 by Max Busch, who published extensively on its use as an analytical reagent for gravimetric analysis. This molecule's potential for carbene-like reactivity would not be recognized until Färber et al. from the University of Kassel published a paper in 2011 showcasing its potential as a carbenic species. This group demonstrated that Nitron reacts as a nucleophilic carbene.

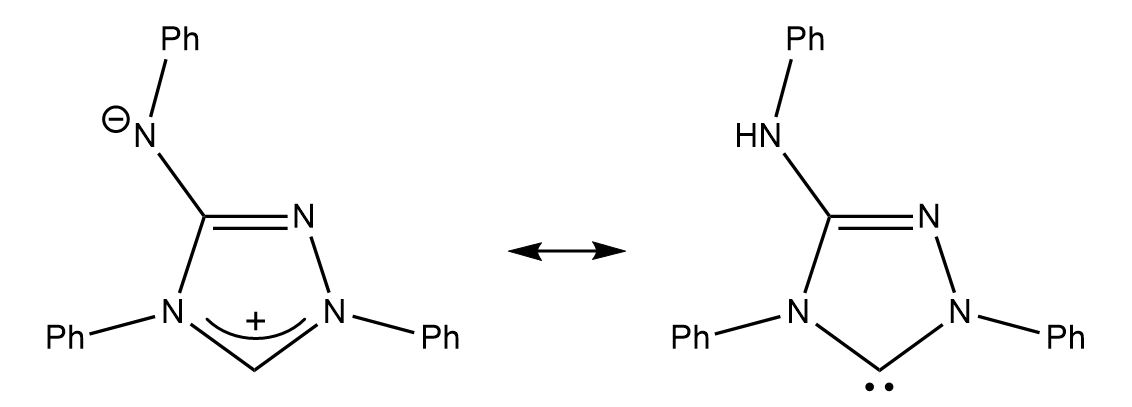
The mesoionic structure of Nitron and the structure of its NHC-type carbenic tautomer

Reaction with elemental Sulfur in THF afforded a triazolinethione derivative. This formation of a C=S double bond is characteristic of nucleophilic carbenes, often referred to as a "trapping" reaction. With addition of CS_{2} in THF, a betainic dithiocarboxylate was synthesized, with its crystal structure fully characterized and its ^{13}CNMR and IR spectra corresponding well with typical NHC analogues. The Rhodium complexes that the group synthesized showed that Nitron acts as a moderate donor ligand, as a reduced CO stretching frequency in the product was confirmed by IR analysis when compared to the starting material, indicating that the significant back-donation into the metal center had occurred, as would be expected from a nucleophilic carbene. Nitron has gained relatively little attention in the literature since this discovery of its carbene reactivity, although a few investigations have been undertaken to determine how its reactivity compares to the more rigorously tested and more commonly used carbene ligands.

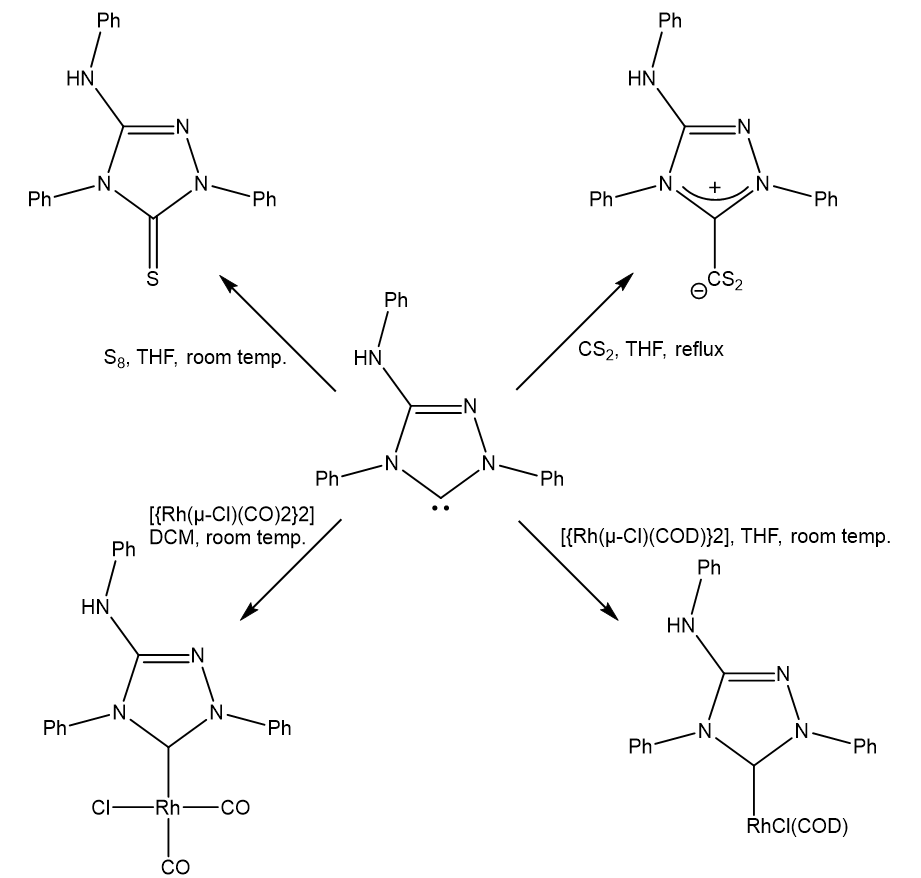
Reactions utilized by Färber et al. (2011) showing nucleophilic carbene-like reactivity.

=== Enders Carbene ===
The University of Kassel group cited their interest in generating new, cheaper-to-produce carbenes because, at the time, the commercially available carbenes "exceed[ed] several hundred US$ per gram. These commercially available carbenes had been in development since the late 1960s. Chemists were trying to make these carbenic species more stable at higher temperatures and exist free in solution without needing to form coordination compounds. Hans-Werner Wanzlick, Guy Bertrand, and Anthony Arduengo were pioneers in the development of these types of persistent carbenes, not exclusively working with the triazol-5-ylidenes.

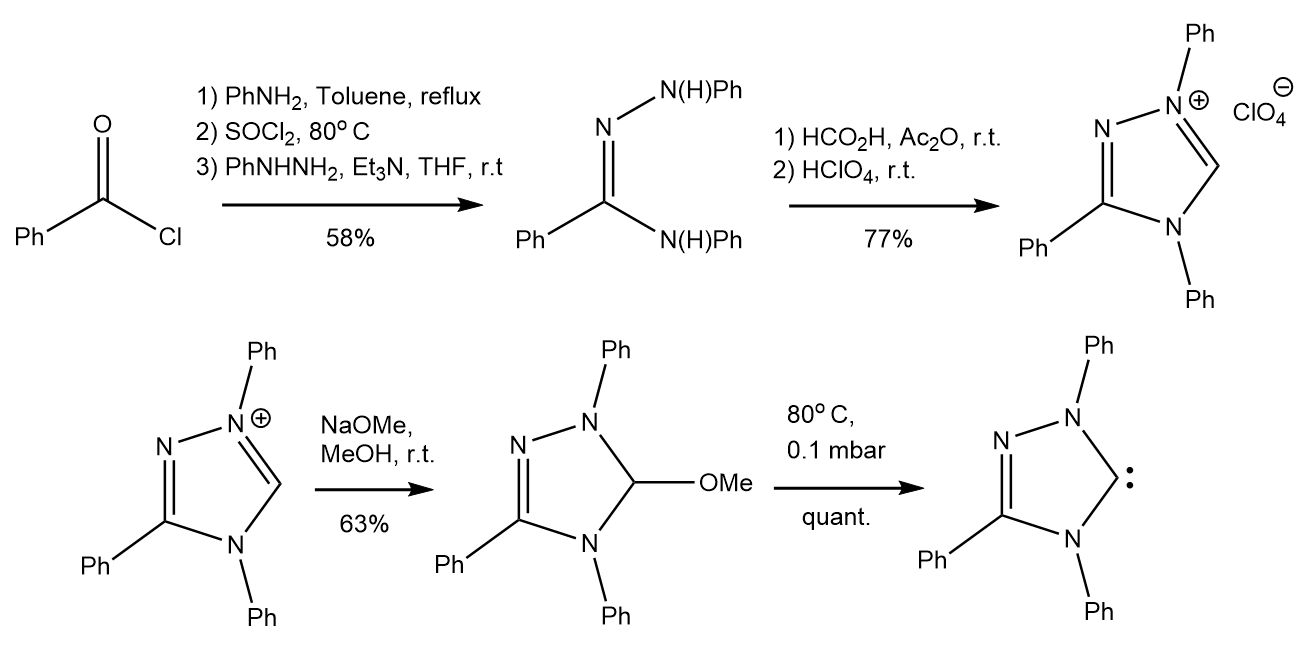
Synthesis of the "Enders carbene" reported in 1995 starting from benzoyl chloride.

Dieter Enders' group developed a carbene in 1995 that was stable enough to be commercially distributed. Starting with benzoyl chloride, they formed a triazolium perchlorate salt over 5 steps. They reacted this triazolium salt with sodium methoxide in methanol, and then carried out a thermal α-elimination of methanol at 80 °C and under low pressure conditions to form the Enders carbene. While all carbenes are very sensitive to oxygen and air and typically decompose readily when exposed to high temperatures. Enders showed that his new carbene was stable up to 150 °C in the absence of air and oxygen. These advances in carbene stability helped to make the commercialization of these reagents a reality. Enders carbene would become the first commercially available carbene. These carbenes, however, were still expensive, as noted by Färber et al. Following this commercialization and dissemination, many analogues of the 1,2,4-triazol-5-ylidene system have been reported and utilized, most often as transition metal coordination compounds. The enders Carbene itself proved to be a powerful catalyst for the conversion of formaldehyde to glycolaldehyde in the "formoin reaction."

=== 1,2,3-triazol-5-ylidene ===
The chemistry of the 1,2,3-triazol-5-ylidene system is a much more recently developed field. This system is based on the 1,2,3-triazole ring and had been indicated to have "non negligible lifetimes" in solution as early as 1975. In 2008, 1,2,3-triazolium iodide salts were observed to react with transition metals to form metal-ligand complexes. In 2010, however, Guy Bertrand's group reported the first crystalline carbene of this class, synthesized via a copper-catalyzed azide–alkyne cycloaddition (click reaction) of 2,6-diisopropylphenyl azide and phenylacetylene. Bertrand's group reported high stability and shelf life for this compound. Since then, many coordination compounds have been reported based on this system—most notably, compounds which are active organocatalysts.

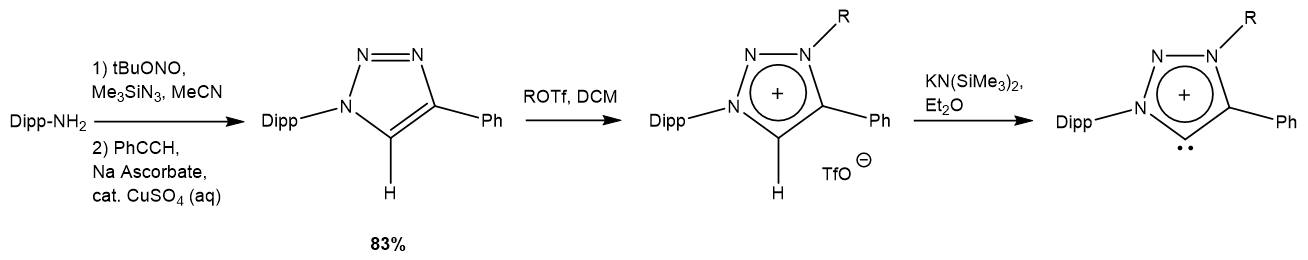
Bertrand's synthesis of free 1,2,3-triazol-5-ylidenes

== Reactivity ==
=== Enhanced Stability ===
Arduengo postulated that the stability of NHC-type carbenes arose from accumulation of electron density around the carbene center, hindering addition reactions from opportunistic nucleophiles. Arduengo concluded that the overall stability of these NHC's resulted from kinetic factors. He stated that "the isolation of a stable carbene is dependent upon the ability of the carbene to exist in a deep local minimum on the potential energy surfaces. It is not important what other minima might also exist on the potential surfaces so long as these minima are not kinetically accessible under ambient conditions likewise." Enders, in a similar manner, referring to the stability of the "enders carbene", posited that the "2p-2p interactions between the carbene carbon atom and the adjacent nitrogen atoms play a significant role in the stabilization of [the molecule]," due to their observation that these N-C bond lengths are considerably shorter than would be expected from single bonds. When comparing their own assessment to Arduengo's rationale for stability, Enders et al. acknowledged in their 1995 paper that "Neither our crystallographic nor our theoretical results permit us to judge the significance of these factors for the stability of the system examined in this work." The combination of strong lone pair donation from the two Nitrogens to the carbene center and the Nitrogens' sigma withdrawing effects are the primary rationales for the stability of these systems.

=== Wanzlick Equilibrium ===
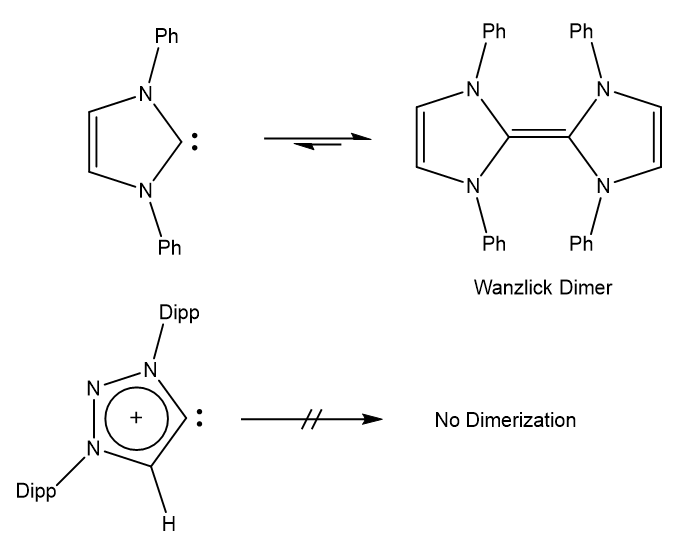
MIC's do not dimerize

The 1,2,3-triazol-5-ylidene system demonstrates fascinating reactivity, particularly with respect to the typical dimerization pathways for NHC's. Guy Bertrand notes "the Wanzlick equilibrium pathway for classical carbenes is disfavored [for these MIC's]." The Wanzlick equilibrium describes a typical dimerization for Arduengo type carbenes (NHC's). Due to their apparent reluctance to participate in this dimerization pathway, carbenes based on the 1,2,3-triazol-5-ylidene system have vastly extended shelf lives. These systems still require significant kinetic stabilization to be stable in solution.

=== Reactions ===
Enders reported that the Enders carbene exhibits typical Lewis basicity, as it readily adds to Lewis acids like BH_{3}∙THF, giving the triazoline–borane adduct. In the same paper, Enders reports many other types of nucleophilic carbene reactions that are not exclusive to this system. The enders carbene undergoes insertion reactions, addition reactions, and cycloadditions in a similar manner to many other NHC systems.

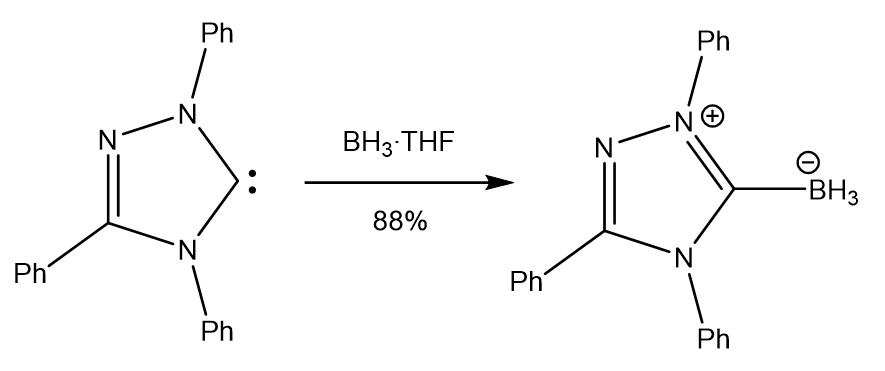
Enders carbene reaction with BH_{3}∙THF

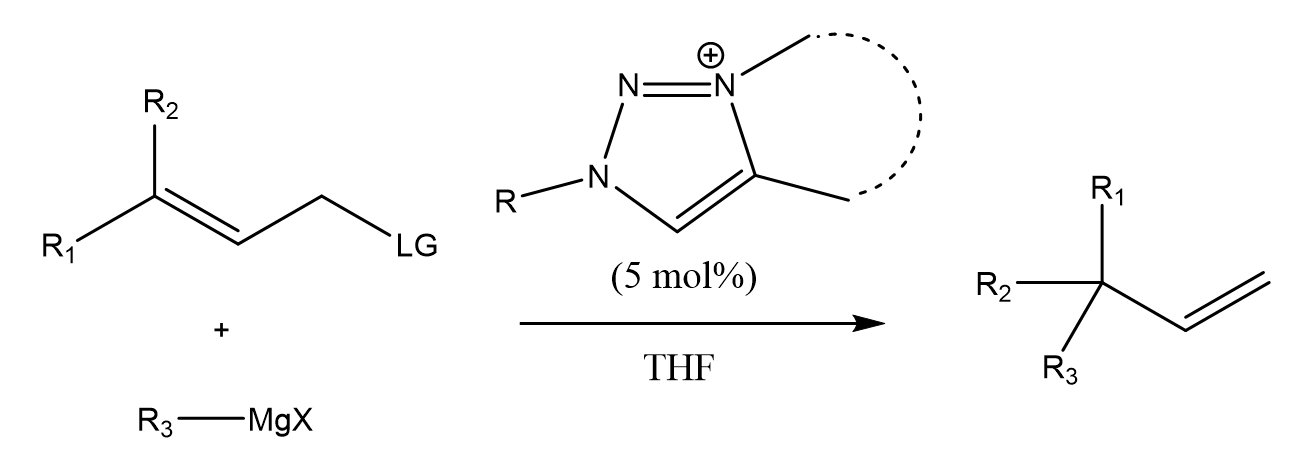
Sn2’ selective Grignard-allylic substitution reaction catalyzed by 1,2,3-triazol-5-ylidene magnesium complexes generated in situ.

Both triazol-5-ylidene systems prove to be excellent organocatalysts. One such catalytic use of these carbenes is an allylic substitution Grignard reaction reported in 2013. The catalytic use of a triazolium salt generates a 1,2,3-triazol-5-ylidene magnesium complex in situ, which, due to its significant Lewis basicity, can back donate to the magnesium center and push the Schlenk equilibrium towards alkyl magnesium products. The Lewis basicity of the catalyst also promotes Sn2' selectivity for this specific reaction. The 1,2,3-triazol-5-ylidene ligand has also been shown to work well with catalytic ruthenium systems promoting olefin metathesis reactions. Other reported catalytic processes facilitated by compounds bearing these MIC ligands include: hydrohydrazination of alkynes, reductive formylation of amines with carbon dioxide and diphenylsilane, hydrogenation and dehydrogenation of N-heteroarenes in water, cycloisomerization of enynes, asymmetric Suzuki−Miyaura cross-coupling reactions, and water oxidation (WO) reactions.

Regarding the 1,2,4-triazol-5-ylidene system, many of its reported coordination compounds are with transition metals, which are usually generated in similar fashion to the analogous imidazole-based NHC ligand-metal systems. One such catalytic use of this system coupled to a transition metal was described in 2010, where the authors used a Gold (I) complex as a regioselective catalyst for the hydroamination of alkynes.

== Triazaborole System ==
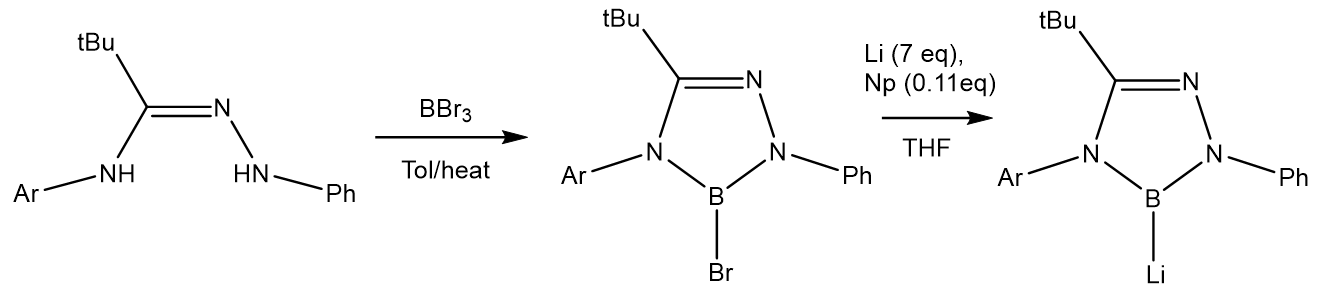
Synthesis of 1,2,4,3-Triazaborol-3-yl-Lithium.

A substituted analogue of the 1,2,4-triazol-5-ylidene system was synthesized in 2016, with a boron atom replacing the carbenic carbon. The synthesized triazaborole-metal system showed interesting reactivity toward CO and isonitriles. The authors also reported that reactions with this triazaborole ring yielded some exceptionally rare boron–metal bonds, such as B–Sb and B–Bi. The structures of these triazaborole rings are stabilized by the interaction between the empty P orbital on the Boron and the lone pairs on the flanking Nitrogens. The aryl groups also provide good kinetic stabilization to the system. Insertion reactions of CO to 1,2,4,3-Triazaborol-3-yl-Lithium yielded reactive carbene species, which the authors utilized as a starting material to generate a 1,2-diboranylethene adduct.

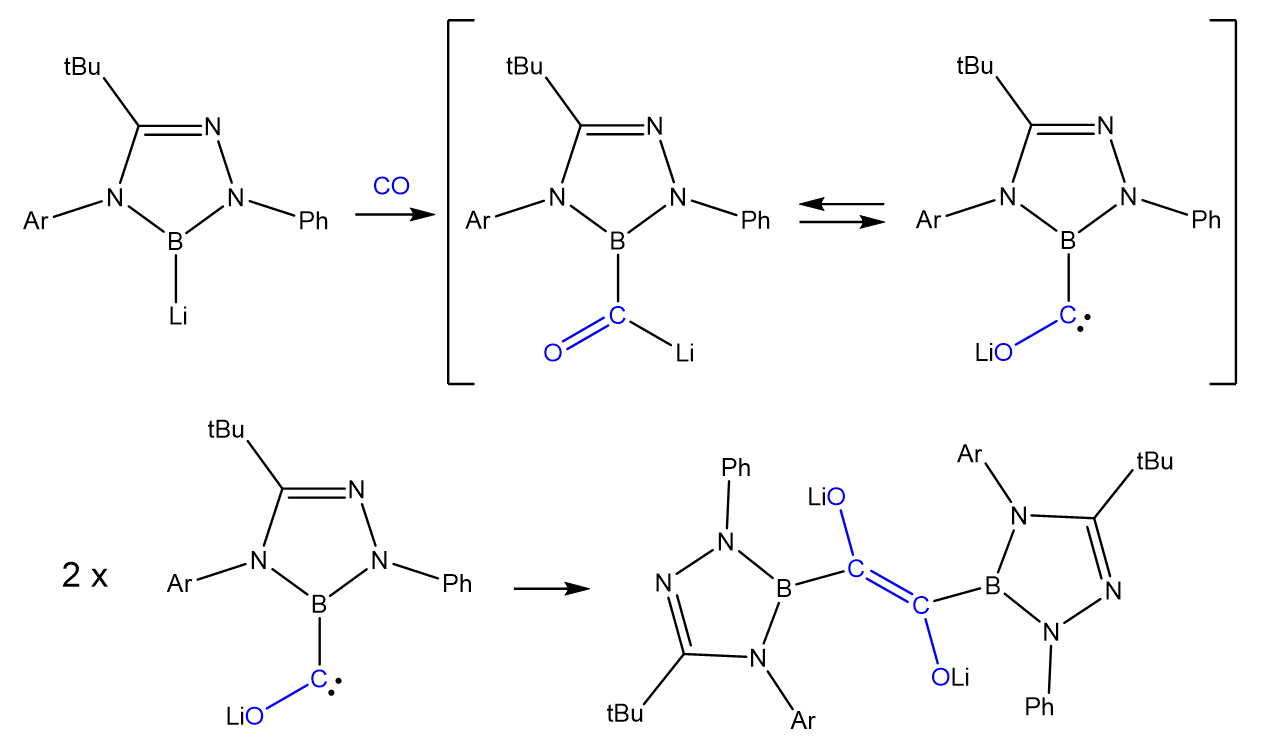
Proposed reaction pathway in the synthesis of the 1,2-diboranylethene adduct.

== See also ==
- Persistent Carbene
- Mesoionic Carbene
