= Guy Bertrand (chemist) =

American chemist

- Born: 17 July 1952 (age 73); Limoges, Haute-Vienne
- Education: University of Montpellier (BSc 1985); Paul Sabatier University, Toulouse (PhD 1979)
- Known for: Synthesis of carbenes
- Awards: CNRS silver medal, 1998; Sir Ronald Nyholm Medal of the SRC, 2009; Grand Prix Le Bel of the French Chemical Society, 2010; ACS Prize in Inorganic Chemistry, 2014; Sir Geoffrey Wilkinson Prize from the SRC, 2016; Sacconi Medal of the Italian Chemical Society, 2017
- Scientific career
- Fields: Chemistry of main group elements from groups 13–16
- Institutions: Sanofi Research, UCSD/CNRS Joint Research Chemistry Laboratory

Guy Bertrand, born on July 17, 1952, at Limoges is a chemistry professor at the University of California, San Diego.

Bertrand obtained his B.Sc. from the University of Montpellier in 1975 and his Ph.D. from the Paul Sabatier University, Toulouse, in 1979. He was a postdoctoral researcher at Sanofi Research, France, in 1981.

The research interests of Bertrand and his co-workers lie mainly in the chemistry of with main group elements from group 13 to 16, at the border between organic, organometallic and inorganic chemistry; especially their use in stabilizing carbenes, nitrenes, phosphinidenes, radicals and biradicals, 1,3-dipoles, anti-aromatic heterocycles, and more. He has directed the synthesis of some original persistent carbenes, including bis(diisopropylamino)cyclopropenylidene, the first example of a carbene with all-carbon environment that is stable at room-temperature.

Guy Bertrand is an honorific member or fellow of several scientific societies, such as the AAAS (2006), the French Academy of Sciences (2004), the European Academy of Sciences (2003), Academia Europaea (2002), and the recipient of various prizes and awards.

== Scientific work ==
Questioning the current dogma is a design feature of Guy Bertrand's research program. He has made many important contributions to the chemistry of main group elements and new binding systems in inorganic, organometallic and organic chemistry. Throughout his career, he has isolated a variety of species that were supposed to be only transitional intermediates, and are now powerful tools for chemists.

Its best-known contribution was the discovery in 1988 of the first stable carbene, a (phosphino)(silyl)carbene, three years before Arduengo's report on a stable N-heterocyclic carbene. Guy Bertrand is at the origin of the chemistry of stable carbenes. Since then, he has made several revolutionary discoveries that have allowed us to better understand the stability of carbenes. He was the first to isolate cyclopropenylidenes, mesoionic carbenes that cannot dimerize, resulting in a relaxation of steric requirements for their isolation More importantly, he discovered cyclic (alkyl) (amino) (amino) carbenes (CAACs), including the recently published six-membered version. CAACs are even richer in electrons than NHCs and phosphines, but at the same time, due to the presence of a single pair of free electrons on nitrogen, CAACs are more accepting than NHCs. The electronic properties of CAACs stabilize highly reactive species, including organic and major group radicals, as well as paramagnetic metal species, such as gold complexes (0), which were completely unknown. CAACs have also allowed the isolation of bis(copper)acetylide complexes, which are key catalytic intermediates in the famous "Click Reaction", and which were supposed to be only transient species. He also used CAACs to prepare and isolate the first isoelectronic nucleophilic tricoordinated organoborane from amines. These recent developments appear paradoxical since they consist in using carbenes long considered as prototypic reactive intermediates to isolate otherwise unstable molecules. Among the large-scale applications already known of CAACs are their use as a ligand for transition metal catalysts. For example, in collaboration with Grubbs, Guy Bertrand has shown that ruthenium catalysts bearing a CAAC are extremely active in the ethenolysis of methyl oleate. This is the first time that a series of metathesis catalysts have performed so well in cross-metathesis reactions using ethylene gas, with sufficient activity to make ethenolysis applicable to the industrial production of linear alpha-olefins (LAOs) and other olefinic end products from biomass.

Today, hundreds of academic and industrial groups use Guy Bertrand's CAACs and other carbenes in transition metal catalysis, but also for other purposes. The most recent developments cover a wide range from nanoparticle stabilization to the antibacterial and anti-cancer properties of silver (I) and gold (I) complexes. A CAAC-copper complex even allows OLEDs to be used with a quantum efficiency close to 100% at high brightness. The discovery of stable carbenes was a breakthrough for fundamental chemistry, a real paradigm shift, but its importance also comes, and perhaps more importantly, from applications. In his review article on "N-heterocyclic carbenes", a terminology that includes carbenes, Glorius et al. wrote: "The discovery and development of N-heterocyclic carbenes is undoubtedly one of the greatest successes of recent chemical research", "N-heterocyclic carbenes are today among the most powerful tools in organic chemistry, with many applications in commercially important processes", "the meteoric rise of NHC is far from over".

Guy Bertrand's contribution is not limited to carbenes. Recent highlights include the isolation of the first stable nitrenes and phosphinidenes. He showed that the first can be used to transfer a nitrogen atom to organic fragments, a difficult task for nitrido complexes of transition metals. For the second, it has recently demonstrated that it mimics the behaviour of transition metals, just like carbenes.

== Honours and awards ==
He was awarded the CNRS silver medal in 1998. He is a member of the French Academy of Technology (2000), the Academia Europaea (2002), the European Academy of Sciences (2003), the French Academy of Sciences (2004) and the American Association for Advancement of Sciences (2006). He was recently awarded the Sir Ronald Nyholm Medal from the SRC (2009), the Grand Prix Le Bel from the French Chemical Society (2010), the ACS Prize in Inorganic Chemistry (2014), the Sir Geoffrey Wilkinson Prize from the SRC (2016) and the Sacconi Medal from the Italian Chemical Society (2017). He is one of the associate editors of Chemical Reviews and a member of the editorial boards of several journals.

He is Chevalier of the Légion d'Honneur.
