= Furoin =

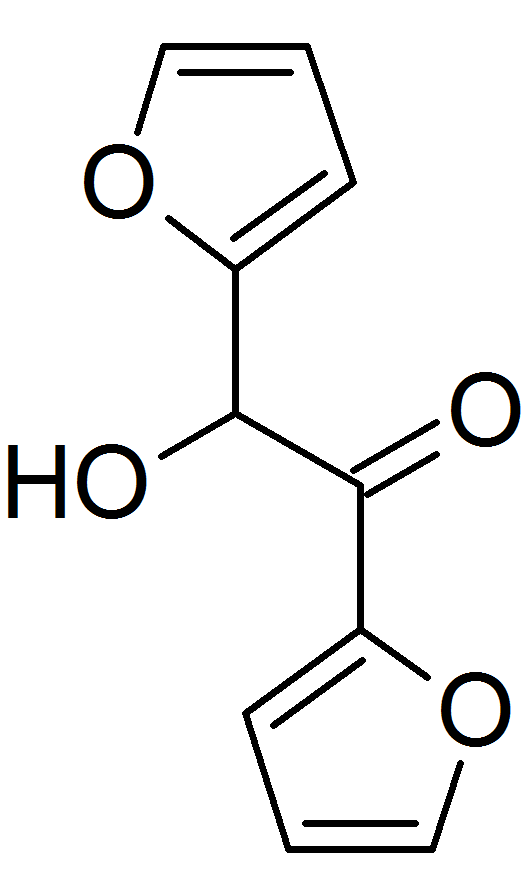

Names
- IUPAC name 1,2-bis(2-furyl)-2-hydroxy-ethanone

Identifiers
CAS Number	552-86-3
3D model (JSmol)	Interactive image
ChEMBL	ChEMBL364893
ChemSpider	10629
ECHA InfoCard	100.008.205
EC Number	209-024-8
PubChem CID	11100
UNII	FP41RNB020
CompTox Dashboard (EPA)	DTXSID60862181
- InChI: InChI=1S/C10H8O4/c11-9(7-3-1-5-13-7)10(12)8-4-2-6-14-8/h1-6,9,11H Key: MIJRFWVFNKQQDK-UHFFFAOYSA-N
- SMILES: O=C(c1occc1)C(O)c2occc2

Properties
Chemical formula	C_{10}H_{8}O_{4}
Molar mass	192.170 g·mol^{−1}
- Except where otherwise noted, data are given for materials in their standard state (at 25 °C [77 °F], 100 kPa). verify (what is ?) Infobox references

Furoin or 1,2-di(furan-2-yl)-2-hydroxyethanone is an organic compound with formula C_{10}H_{8}O_{4}. It can be produced from furfural by a benzoin condensation reaction catalyzed by cyanide ions.

== Reactions ==
Furoin synthesis from furfural is also catalyzed by vitamin B_{1} (thiamine). In 1957, Ronald Breslow proposed that this reaction involves a relatively stable carbene form of thiamine. In the catalytic cycle shown below two molecules of furfural react to give furoin, via a thiazol-2-ylidene catalyst, resulting from loss of one proton at carbon 2 of the thiazolium cation of vitamin B_{1}:

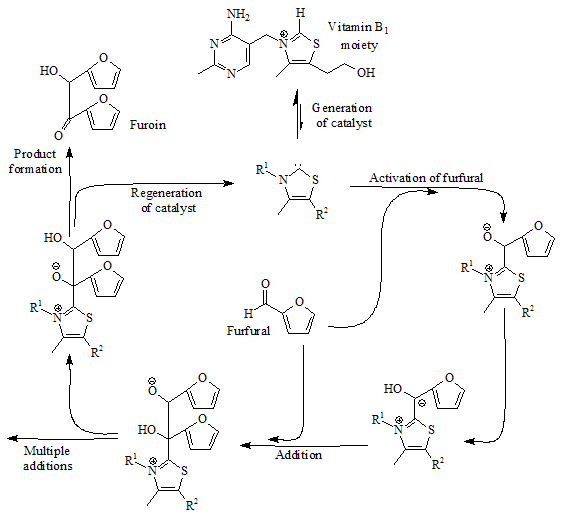
Furoin formation from furfural, catalysed by thiamine

This was the first evidence for the existence of persistent carbenes.

== Uses ==
Furoin has been used as a plasticizer.
