= Bis(trimethylsilyl)mercury =

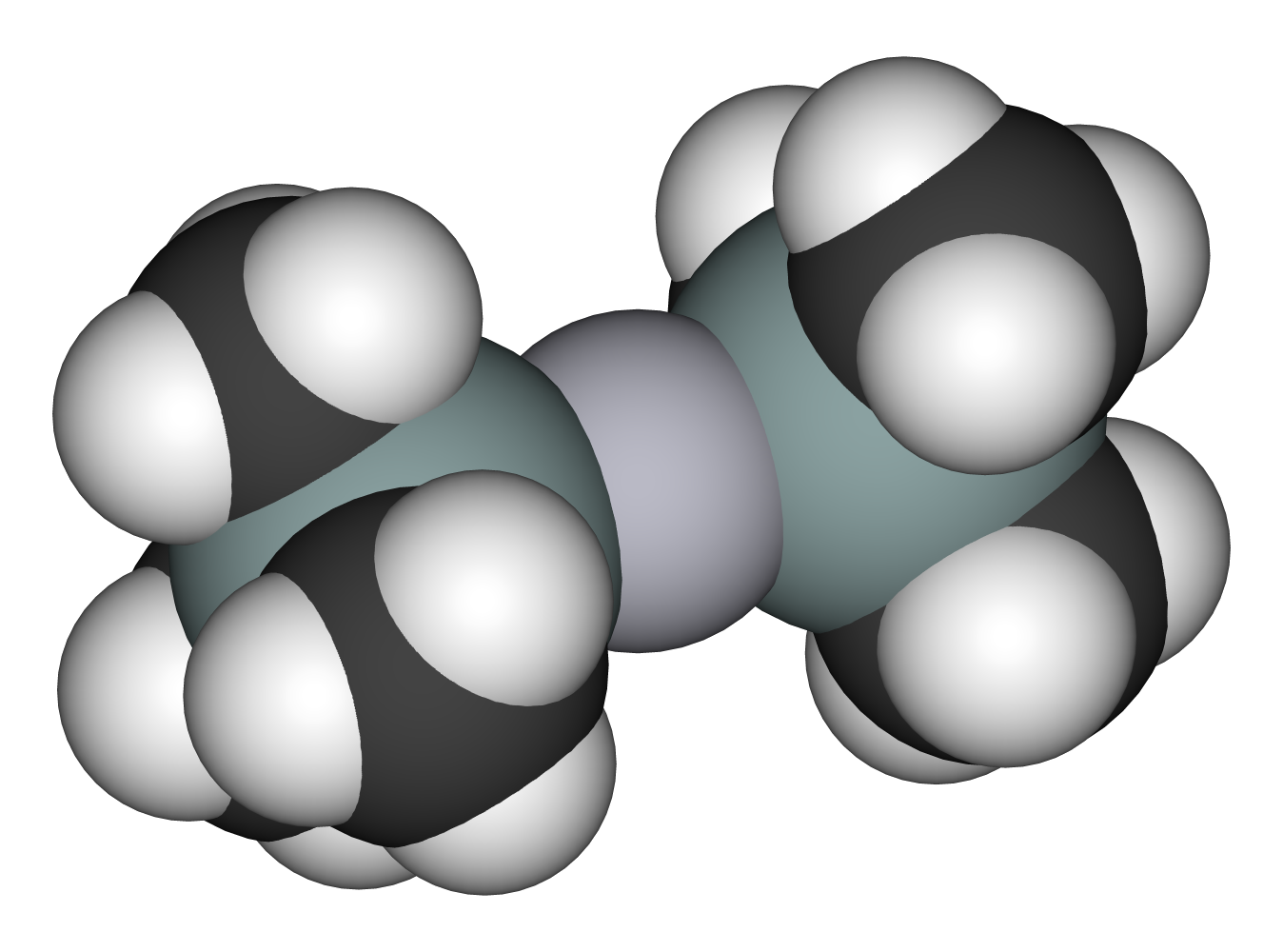

Identifiers
CAS Number	4656-04-6
3D model (JSmol)	Interactive image
ChemSpider	21106419
EC Number	236-315-7
PubChem CID	83317
CompTox Dashboard (EPA)	DTXSID20196873
- InChI: InChI=1S/2C3H9Si.Hg/c2*1-4(2)3;/h2*1-3H3; Key: RKCQQCXHUWKHGR-UHFFFAOYSA-N; InChI=1/2C3H9Si.Hg/c2*1-4(2)3;/h2*1-3H3;/rC6H18HgSi2/c1-8(2,3)7-9(4,5)6/h1-6H3 Key: RKCQQCXHUWKHGR-GMLBIIQIAA
- SMILES: C[Si](C)(C)[Hg][Si](C)(C)C

Properties
Chemical formula	C_{6}H_{18}HgSi_{2}
Molar mass	346.972 g·mol^{−1}
Boiling point	104 °C (377 K)(dec.)

Hazards
- GHS labelling
Pictograms	(GHS06: Toxic) (GHS08: Health hazard) (GHS09: Environmental hazard)
Signal word	Danger
Hazard statements	H300, H310, H330, H373, H410
Precautionary statements	P260, P262, P264, P270, P271, P273, P280, P284, P301+P310, P302+P350, P304+P340, P310, P314, P320, P321, P330, P361, P363, P391, P403+P233, P405, P501
- Except where otherwise noted, data are given for materials in their standard state (at 25 °C [77 °F], 100 kPa). verify (what is ?) Infobox references

Bis(trimethylsilyl)mercury is a chemical reagent with the formula (CH_{3})_{3}-Si-Hg-Si-(CH_{3})_{3}.

== Synthesis ==
This compound was first synthesized by Wiberg et al. in 1963, by the reaction of trimethylsilyl bromide with sodium amalgam:

2 Na + Hg + TMSBr → TMS_{2}Hg + 2 NaBr

== Reactions ==
On prolonged heating at 100-160 °C, or when stood under light as an ethereal solution, it decomposes to hexamethyldisilane:

TMS_{2}Hg → (CH_{3})_{3}Si-Si(CH_{3})_{3} + Hg

Reaction with hydrogen chloride gives trimethylsilane and trimethylsilyl chloride:

TMS_{2}Hg + HCl → TMSH + TMSCl + Hg
