= Cyclopropenylidene =

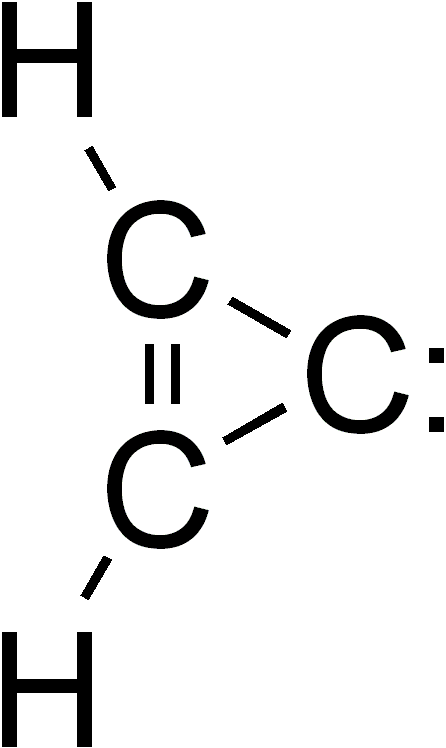
Structural formula
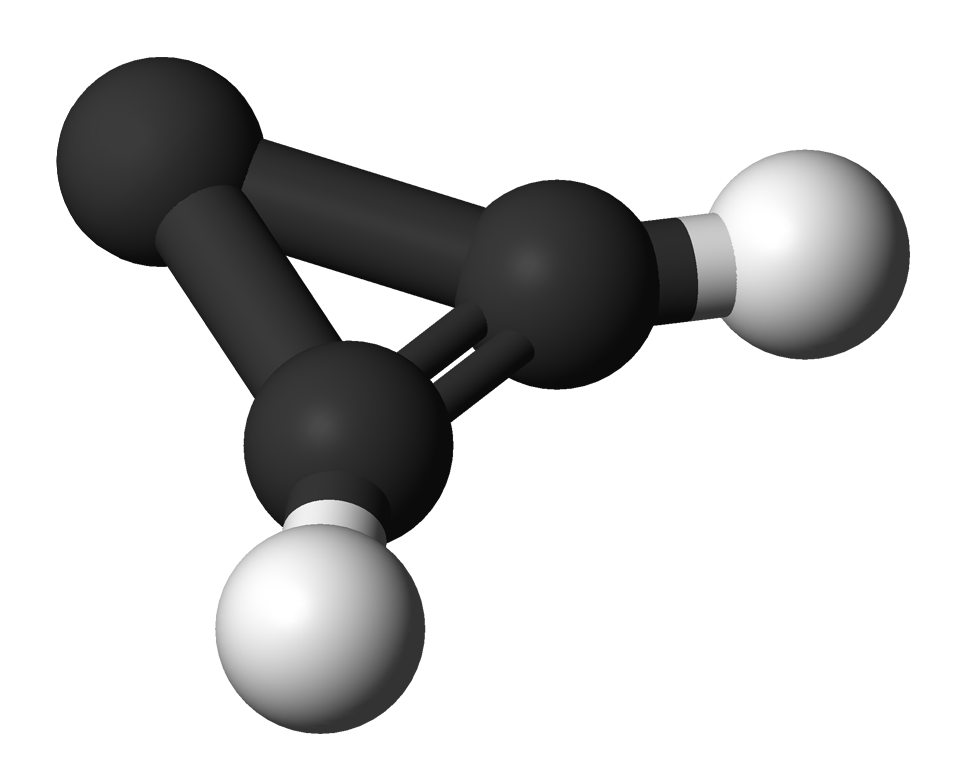
Ball-and-stick model

Names
- Preferred IUPAC name Cycloprop-2-en-1-ylidene

Identifiers
CAS Number	16165-40-5
3D model (JSmol)	Interactive image
ChemSpider	4937408
PubChem CID	6432149
CompTox Dashboard (EPA)	DTXSID801027116
- InChI: InChI=1S/C3H2/c1-2-3-1/h1-2H Key: VVLPCWSYZYKZKR-UHFFFAOYSA-N; InChI=1/C3H2/c1-2-3-1/h1-2H Key: VVLPCWSYZYKZKR-UHFFFAOYAY
- SMILES: C1=C[C]1

Properties
Chemical formula	C_{3}H_{2}
Molar mass	38.049 g·mol^{−1}
Conjugate acid	Cyclopropenium ion
- Except where otherwise noted, data are given for materials in their standard state (at 25 °C [77 °F], 100 kPa). verify (what is ?) Infobox references

Cyclopropenylidene, or c-C_{3}H_{2}, is a partially aromatic molecule belonging to a highly reactive class of organic molecules known as carbenes. On Earth, cyclopropenylidene is only seen in the laboratory due to its reactivity. However, cyclopropenylidene is found in significant concentrations in the interstellar medium (ISM) and on Saturn's moon Titan. Its C_{2v} symmetric isomer, propadienylidene (CCCH_{2}) is also found in the ISM, but with abundances about an order of magnitude lower. A third C_{2} symmetric isomer, propargylene (HCCCH), has not yet been detected in the ISM, most likely due to its low dipole moment.

== History ==
The astronomical detection of c-C_{3}H_{2} was first confirmed in 1985. Four years earlier, several ambiguous lines had been observed in the radio region of spectra taken of the ISM, but the observed lines were not identified at the time. These lines were later matched with a spectrum of c-C_{3}H_{2} using an acetylene-helium discharge. Surprisingly, c-C_{3}H_{2} has been found to be ubiquitous in the ISM. Detections of c-C_{3}H_{2} in the diffuse medium were particularly surprising because of the low densities. It had been believed that the chemistry of the diffuse medium did not allow for the formation of larger molecules, but this discovery, as well as the discovery of other large molecules, continue to illuminate the complexity of the diffuse medium. More recently, observations of c-C_{3}H_{2} in dense clouds have also found concentrations that are significantly higher than expected. This has led to the hypothesis that the photodissociation of polycyclic aromatic hydrocarbons (PAHs) enhances the formation of c-C_{3}H_{2}.

=== Titan (Moon of Saturn) ===
On 15 October 2020, it was announced that small amounts of cyclopropenylidene had been found in the atmosphere of Titan, the largest moon of Saturn using the ALMA telescope. Cyclopropenylidene became the fifth C_{3}H_{n} (three carbon) hydrocarbon molecule detected on Titan, after previous detections of CH_{3}CCH (propyne) and C_{3}H_{8} (propane); C_{3}H_{6} (propene); and CH_{2}CCH_{2} (propadiene).

== Formation ==
The formation reaction of c-C_{3}H_{2} has been speculated to be the dissociative recombination of c-C_{3}H^{+}_{3}.

C_{3}H^{+}_{3} + e^{−} → C_{3}H_{2} + H

c-C_{3}H^{+}_{3} is a product of a long chain of carbon chemistry that occurs in the ISM. Carbon insertion reactions are crucial in this chain for forming C_{3}H^{+}_{3}. However, as for most ion-molecule reactions speculated to be important in interstellar environments, this pathway has not been verified by laboratory studies. The protonation of ammonia by c-C_{3}H^{+}_{3} is another formation reaction. However, under typical dense cloud conditions, this reaction contributes less than 1% of the formation of C_{3}H_{2}.

Crossed molecular beam experiments indicate that the reaction of the methylidyne radical (CH) with acetylene (C_{2}H_{2}) forms cyclopropenylidene plus atomic hydrogen and also propadienylidene plus atomic hydrogen. The neutral–neutral reaction between atomic carbon and the vinyl radical (C_{2}H_{3}) also forms cyclopropenylidene plus atomic hydrogen. Both reactions are rapid at 10 K and have no entrance barrier and provide efficient formation pathways in cold interstellar environments and hydrocarbon-rich atmospheres of planets and their moons.

Matrix isolated cyclopropenylidene has been prepared by flash vacuum thermolysis of a quadricyclane derivative in 1984.

== Destruction ==
Cyclopropenylidene is generally destroyed by reactions between ions and neutral molecules. Of these, protonation reactions are the most common. Any species of the type HX^{+} can react to convert the c-C_{3}H_{2} back to c-C_{3}H^{+}_{3}. Due to rate constant and concentration considerations, the most important reactants for the destruction of c-C_{3}H_{2} are HCO^{+}, H^{+}_{3}, and H_{3}O^{+}.

C_{3}H_{2} + HCO^{+} → C_{3}H^{+}_{3} + CO

Notice that c-C_{3}H_{2} is mostly destroyed by converting it back to C_{3}H^{+}_{3}. Since the major destruction pathways only regenerate the major parent molecule, C_{3}H_{2} is essentially a dead end in terms of interstellar carbon chemistry. However, in diffuse clouds or in the photodissociation region (PDR) of dense clouds, the reaction with C^{+} becomes much more significant and C_{3}H_{2} can begin to contribute to the formation of larger organic molecules.

== Spectroscopy ==
Detections of c-C_{3}H_{2} in the ISM rely on observations of molecular transitions using rotational spectroscopy. Since c-C_{3}H_{2} is an asymmetric top, the rotational energy levels are split and the spectrum becomes complicated. Also, it should be noticed that C_{3}H_{2} has spin isomers much like the spin isomers of hydrogen. These ortho and para forms exist in a 3:1 ratio and should be thought of as distinct molecules. Although the ortho and para forms look identical chemically, the energy levels are different, meaning that the molecules have different spectroscopic transitions.

When observing c-C_{3}H_{2} in the interstellar medium, there are only certain transitions that can be seen. In general, only a few lines are available for use in astronomical detection. Many lines are unobservable because they are absorbed by the Earth's atmosphere. The only lines that can be observed are those that fall in the radio window. The more commonly observed lines are the 1_{10} to 1_{01} transition at 18343 MHz and the 2_{12} to 1_{01} transition at 85338 MHz of ortho-c-C_{3}H_{2}.

== See also ==
- List of molecules in interstellar space
