= Mesoionic carbene =

Type of reactive intermediate in chemistry

In chemistry, mesoionic carbenes (MICs) are a type of reactive intermediate that are related to N-heterocyclic carbenes (NHCs); thus, MICs are also referred to as abnormal N-heterocyclic carbenes (aNHCs) or remote N-heterocyclic carbenes (rNHCs). Unlike simple NHCs, the canonical resonance structures of these carbenes are mesoionic: an MIC cannot be drawn without adding additional charges to some of the atoms.

A variety of free carbenes can be isolated and are stable at room temperature. Other free carbenes are not stable and are susceptible to intermolecular decomposition pathways. MICs do not dimerize according to Wanzlick equilibrium as do normal NHCs. This results in relaxed steric requirements for mesoionic carbenes as compared to NHCs.

There are several mesoionic carbenes that cannot be generated as free compounds, but can be synthesized as a ligand in a transition metal complex. Most MIC transition metal complexes are less sensitive to air and moisture than phosphine or normal NHC complexes. They are also resistant to oxidation. The robust nature of MIC complexes is due to the ligand’s strong σ-donating ability. They are stronger σ-donors than phosphines, as well as normal N-heterocyclic carbenes due to decreased heteroatom stabilization. The strength of carbene ligands is attributed to the electropositive carbon center that forms strong bonds of a covalent nature with the metal. They have been shown to lower the frequency of CO stretching vibrations in metal complexes and exhibit large trans effects.

== Classes ==
=== Imidazolin-4-ylidenes ===
The most studied mesoionic carbenes are based on imidazole and are referred to as imidazolin-4-ylidenes. These complexes were first reported by Crabtree in 2001. The formation of imidazolin-4-ylidenes (MIC) instead of imidazolin-2-ylidenes (NHC) is typically a matter of blocking the C2 position. Most imidazolin-4-ylidenes are trisubstituted in the N1, C2, and N3 positions or tetrasubstituted. Electron-withdrawing groups in the N3 and C5 positions stabilize the carbenes more than electron-donating groups. Free carbenes as well as numerous transition metal complexes have been synthesized.

=== 1,2,3-triazolylidenes ===
Also well studied are the mesoionic carbenes based on 1,2,3-triazole, referred to as 1,2,3-triazol-4(or 5)-ylidenes. The first triazolylidenes were reported by Albrecht in 2008. These carbenes are typically trisubstituted with alkyl groups in the N1 and N3 positions and an aryl group in the C4 or C5 position. Free carbenes as well as numerous transition metal complexes have been reported. Free carbenes that are alkylated at N3 tend to undergo decomposition reactions in which the alkyl group participates in a nucleophilic attack at the carbene position. If N3 is substituted with a bulky alkyl group or an aryl group, the stability of the carbene increases significantly.

=== Pyrazolinylidenes ===
The first mesoionic carbenes based on pyrazole have been reported by Huynh in 2007. These carbenes are referred to as pyrazolin-3(or 4)-ylidenes. Pyrazolin-4-ylidenes are often tetrasubstituted with alkyl or aryl groups; however, the C3 and C5 positions could be substituted with nitrogen- or oxygen-based groups. The electronic properties of the groups in the C3 and C5 positions affect the overall electron properties of the ligand and influence catalytic activity. Free carbene have been produced as well as transition metal complexes.

=== Others ===
Examples of tetrazol-5-ylidenes based on tetrazole have been prepared by Araki. The N1 and N3 positions are substituted with alkyl or aryl groups. Transition metal complexes of these carbenes have been generated in situ. Mesoionic carbenes based on isoxazole and thiazole have been reported by Albrecht and Bertrand respectively. The isoxazol-4-ylidenes are trisubstituted in the N2, C3, and C5 positions with alkyl groups. The thiazol-5-ylidenes are trisubstituted in the C2, N3, and C4 positions with aryl groups. Transition metal complexes of both types of carbenes have been generated in situ. Bertrand also reported a 1,3-dithiol-5-ylidene based on 1,3-dithiolane, but it can only be isolated as a transition metal complex.

== Synthesis of free carbenes ==
Many free mesoionic carbenes are synthesized from their protonated salt form by deprotonation using strong potassium bases, such as potassium bis(trimethylsilyl)amide (KHMDS) or potassium tert-butoxide (KOt-Bu). Potassium bases are used because they do not form stable carbene-alkali metal adducts.

Imidazolin-4-ylidenes (MIC) would form rather than imidazolin-2-ylidenes (NHC) due to blocking the C2 position. The C2 carbenes are thermodynamically more stable than their C4 counterparts due to resonance and inductive carbon-nitrogen interactions. Also, calculations show that the C4 hydrogen is less acidic than the C2 hydrogen of imidazole. This data suggests that the C2 position should be activated preferentially to the C4 position unless the C2 position is blocked. Aryl and bulky alkyl groups (such as isopropyl) are good at blocking the C2 position from being activated.

== Carbene metal complexes ==
Many mesoionic carbenes may not be able to be isolated as a free carbene; however, these MICs can be generated as a ligand for transition metal complexes. Numerous mesoionic carbene transition metal complexes are known with metals including Fe, Os, Rh, Ir, Ni, Pd, Pt, Cu, and Ag. Metal complexes with Sm and Y are also known. MIC complexes are formed by a variety of mechanisms.

Mesoionic carbenes may be generated in situ with addition of a strong base to their salt forms. The carbenes immediately form complexes with metals present in the reaction mixture through ligand exchange.

Direct metalation through C-H bond activation or C-H oxidative addition is one method often utilized. Activation of a C‒H bond leads to oxidative addition of the carbene ligand to the metal center. Typically, direct metalation requires the blockage of sites that would lead to normal NHC complexes — phenyl and isopropyl groups are good blocking substituents, as discussed earlier. Smaller substituents may be cleaved. Direct metalation by silver(I) with imidazolium salts can cause cleavage at the C2 position if methyl is used as the blocking group. The result is formation of normal NHC carbenes. n-alkyl and benzyl groups may undergo the same fate as the methyl group. Steric bulk may also influence the formation of MIC complexes over NHC complexes. For imidazolium salts, the C2 position may not need to be blocked if the nitrogen substituents (N1 or N3) are sterically-demanding. Interactions between the nitrogen substituents and the metal center prevent normal NHC complexes from forming. If the carbene is part of a bidentate ligand with a forced geometry, the MIC complex may form preferentially as well. The counteranion of imidazolium salts participates in NHC vs. MIC formation. NHC formation typically occurs by heterolytic bond cleavage, so small, coordinating anions favor this pathway. MIC formation typically occurs by an oxidative addition pathway, so non-coordinating and apolar anions are preferred, such as BF_{4}^{−} or SbF_{6}^{−}. Other techniques focus on the activation of the desired carbon rather than blocking undesired carbons. A carbon may be activated by a halogen. A C-X bond (X = halide) is more favorable for activation than a C-H bond. This pathway results in the oxidative addition of the MIC carbene halide to a low valent metal center.

Transmetalation is another method commonly utilized. Typically, a silver carbene complex is produced by direct metalation. This silver complex is reacted via transmetalation with a salt of the desired metal. The metal MIC complex is produced and silver salts generally precipitate.

== Applications in catalysis ==
Since mesoionic carbene ligands are very strong σ-donors and make it easier for a metal center to undergo oxidative addition, MIC ligands have the potential to be useful in catalysis. MIC transition metal complexes have been tested as catalysts in olefin metathesis, ring closure metathesis, and ring opening polymerization metathesis. The MIC complexes work very well, and in many cases, they outperform their NHC counterparts. MIC complexes have been successful as catalysts for Suzuki-Miyaura and Heck-Mizoroki cross-coupling reactions. Again, in many cases, MIC catalysts are superior to their NHC counterparts. For example, in olefin metathesis, MIC catalysts are active at room temperature after simply addition of a Brønsted acid, such as hydrochloric acid or trifluoroacetic acid, compared to the large amount of thermal activation required for NHC catalysts. MIC complexes have found use as catalysts in olefin hydrogenation. They have been shown to hydrogenate terminal and cis-alkenes. They work better than their NHC counterparts due to the MIC ligand’s stronger electron-donating properties. They are better able to provide electron density to promote hydrogen gas oxidative addition to the metal. MIC complexes have been used in transfer hydrogenation reactions. For example, they have been used to hydrogenate a diaryl ketone using isopropanol as a hydrogen source., MIC complexes are being considered as green chemistry catalysts. They act as catalysts for base- and oxidant-free oxidation of alcohols and amines. Some complexes have also been shown to synthesize certain aryl amides. Other MIC complexes have been used in hydroarylation, involving the addition of an electron-rich aryl group and a hydrogen across a multiple bond. The reactions that mesoionic carbene complexes catalyze will continue to expand as more research is done.
