= Transition metal NHC complex =

In coordination chemistry, a transition metal NHC complex is a metal complex containing one or more N-heterocyclic carbene ligands. Such compounds are the subject of much research, in part because of prospective applications in homogeneous catalysis. One such success is the second generation Grubbs catalyst.

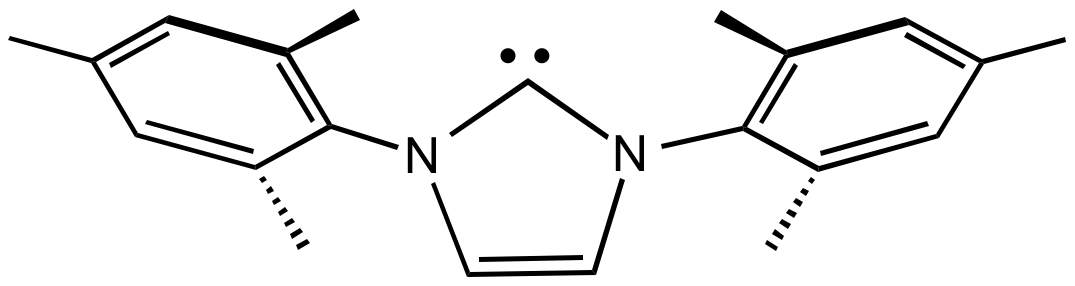
IMes is a popular NHC ligand.

Historically, N-heterocyclic carbenes were thought to mimic properties of tertiary phosphines. Many steric and electronic differences exist between the two ligands. Compared to phosphine ligands, NHC ligands' cone angle is more complex. The imidazole ring of the NHC ligand is angled away from the metal center, yet the substituents at the 1,3 positions of the imidazole ring are angled towards it. The presence of the ligand inside of the metal coordination sphere affects the metal reactivity. In terms of electronic effects, NHC often show stronger sigma donation.

Second generation Grubbs catalyst is a transition metal NHC complex, is useful for alkene metathesis reactions.

== Synthesis ==
=== From free NHCs ===
The popularization of NHC ligands can be traced to Arduengo, who reported the deprotonation of dimesitylimidazolium cation to give IMes. IMes is a free NHC that can be used as a ligand. Other NHCs have been isolated as the free ligands. Aside from IMes, another important NHC ligand is IPr, which features 2,6-diisopropylphenyl groups in place of the mesityl groups. NHCs with saturated backbones include SIMes and SIPr.

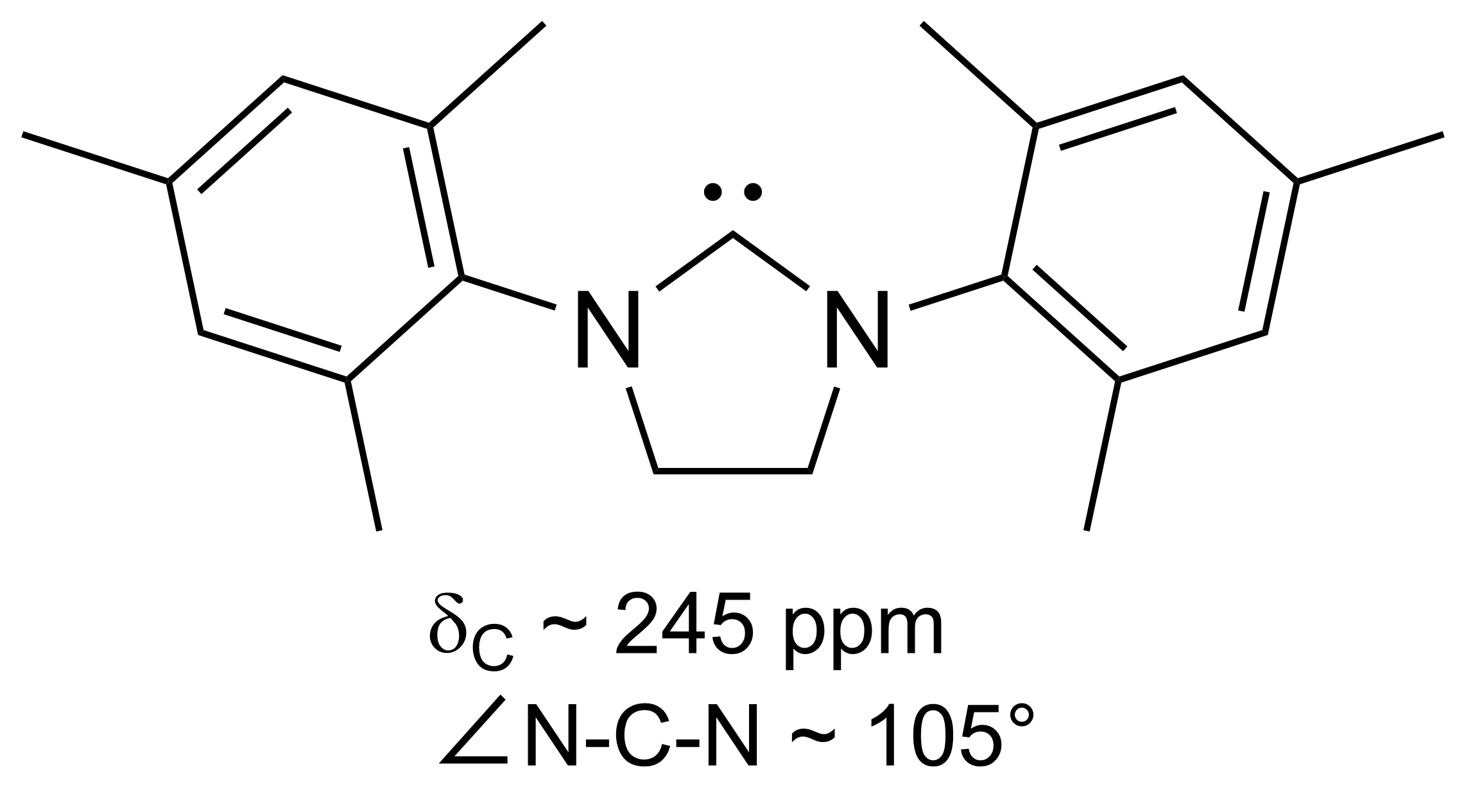
SIMes is a popular NHC ligand with a more flexible backbone compared to IMes

=== Transmetallation of silver-NHC reagents ===
Usually, transition metal NHC complexes are prepared less directly. A popular method entails transmetallation of silver-NHC complexes. Such reagents are generated by the reaction of silver(I) oxide with the imidazolium salt.

=== Other methods ===
A third method involves decarboxylation of NHC-carboxylates. In this approach, N-methylimidazoles react with methyl formate to give zwitterionic N,N'-dimethylimidazolium-2-carboxylate. This zwitterion decarboxylates in the presence of metal ions to give N,N'dimethylimidazolidene-based NHC complexes.

== See also ==
- Palladium–NHC complex
- Coinage metal N-heterocyclic carbene complexes
- Cyclic iron tetra N-heterocyclic carbenes
