= C3H6N2 =

The molecular formula C_{3}H_{6}N_{2} (molar mass: 70.09 g/mol, exact mass: 70.0531 u) may refer to:

- Aminopropionitrile (BAPN)
- Dihydroimidazol-2-ylidene
- Imidazolines
  - 2-Imidazoline
- Pyrazoline
