= Wanzlick equilibrium =

Chemical equilibrium between a relatively stable carbene compound and its dimer

The Wanzlick equilibrium is a chemical equilibrium between a relatively stable carbene compound and its dimer. The equilibrium was proposed to apply to certain electron-rich alkenes, such as tetraminoethylenes, which have been called "carbene dimers." Such equilibria occur, but the mechanism does not proceed simply, but requires catalysts.

== Original conjecture ==
In 1960, Hans-Werner Wanzlick and E. Schikora proposed that carbenes derived from dihydroimidazol-2-ylidene were generated by vacuum pyrolysis of 2-trichloromethyl dihydroimidazole derivatives, with the loss of chloroform.

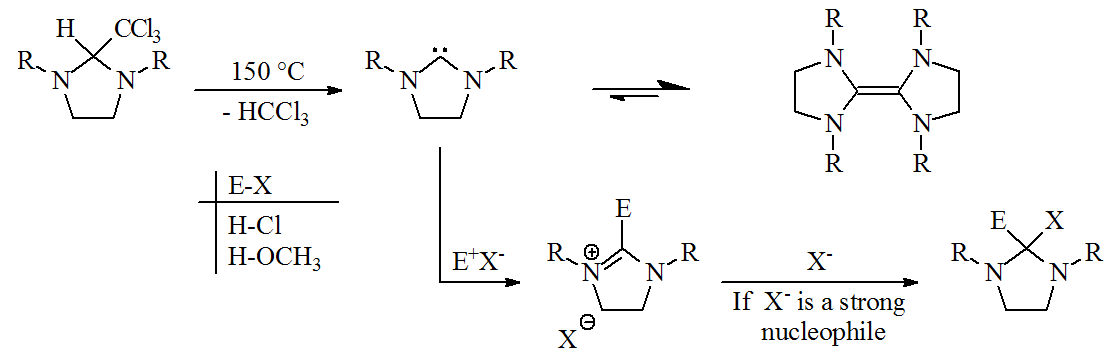
Wanzlick's proposed mechanism for the reaction of dihydroimidazol-2-ylidene with electrophiles

Wanzlick and Schikora believed that once prepared these carbenes existed in an unfavourable equilibrium with their corresponding dimers. This assertion was based on reactivity studies which they believed showed that the free carbene reacted with electrophiles (E-X). The dimer (a substituted tetraaminoethylene) was believed to be inactive to the electrophiles (E-X), and thought to merely act as a stable carbene reservoir.

== Conjecture challenged ==
Wanzlick's hypothesis of a carbene-dimer equilibrium was tested by David M. Lemal and others. Heating mixtures of tetraaminoethylene derivatives did not produce mixed dimers:

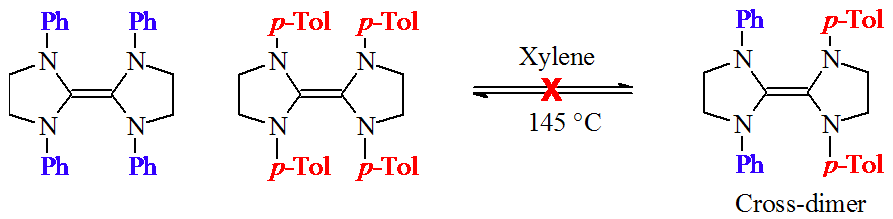
Dimer cross-over experiment

This result indicates that a 'carbene-dimer equilibrium' does not occur for these dihydroimidazol-2-ylidene derivatives.

Lemal proposed that Wanzlick's observations could be explained by acid-catalyzed reactions.

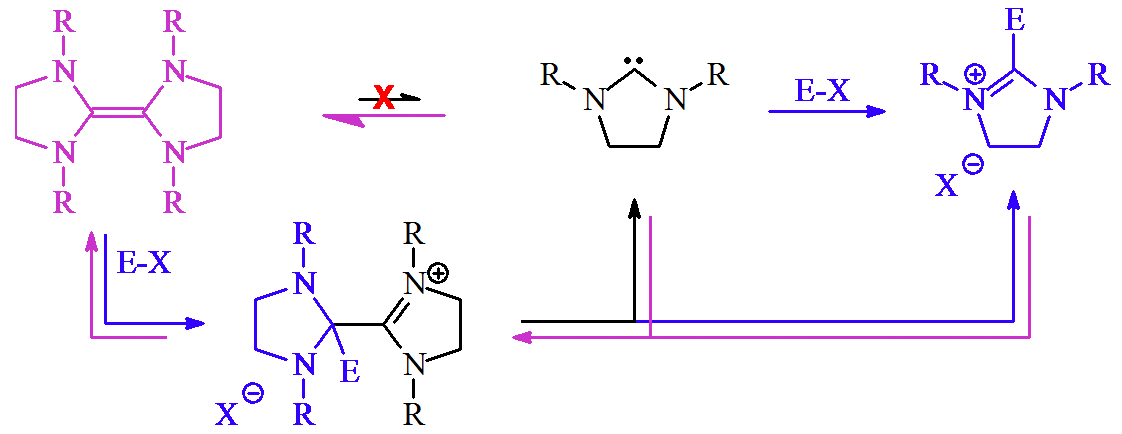
Lemal's mechanism for the reaction of tetraaminoethylene with electrophiles. In conditions of excess E-X, the salt (blue) is formed. In conditions of catalytic E-X, the dimer (purple) will be formed. However, this is based on the assumption that the dimer is more stable than the carbene; but this assumption has been questioned. E-X may be an acid or even a metal salt e.g. LiCl.

Lemal proposed that the electrophile converts the tetraaminoethylenes into cationic species. He proposed that this cation then dissociated into the free carbene plus the resultant salt. The free carbene could then either re-dimerise, regenerating the tetraaminoethylene starting material, or react with E-X (as Wanzlick originally predicted), with either route eventually giving the same reaction product, the dihydroimidazolium salt.

== Conjecture confirmed ==
In 1999 Michael K. Denk reinvestigated the cross-over experiments that supported the Wanzlick equilibrium. This report prompted Lemal to repeat his 1964 experiments. Denk's findings were confirmed only with deuterated tetrahydrofuran (THF) as a solvent. With toluene and added KH as an electrophile quencher, however, the cross-over product was again not observed.

In 1999 Lemal and others investigated an equilibrium between a dibenzotetraazafulvalene derivative and its carbene. These studies led Böhm & Herrmann to conclude in 2000 that "the Wanzlick equilibrium between a tetraaminoethylene and its corresponding carbene did exist". This notion was confirmed in 2010 by Kirmse.

Others subsequently showed that unhindered diaminocarbenes form dimers by acid-catalysed dimerisation as shown in the Lemal.

Sublimation experiments with carbene dimers and their protonated derivatives quantify acid catalysis and corroborate that tetraaminoolefins may dissociate without adventitious protons. Acid catalysis is however required for the dissociation of triaminoolefins (NHC-CAAC dimers).
