= Nutlin =

Nutlin 3

Names
- IUPAC name (±)-4-[4,5-Bis(4-chlorophenyl)-2-(2-isopropoxy-4-methoxy-phenyl)-4,5-dihydro-imidazole-1-carbonyl]-piperazin-2-one
- Other names Nutlin

Identifiers
CAS Number	548472-68-0
3D model (JSmol)	Interactive image
ChEBI	CHEBI:46742
ChEMBL	ChEMBL191334
ChemSpider	187530
DrugBank	DB17039
EC Number	637-233-8
PubChem CID	16755649
UNII	53IA0V845C
- InChI: InChI=1S/C30H30Cl2N4O4/c1-18(2)40-25-16-23(39-3)12-13-24(25)29-34-27(19-4-8-21(31)9-5-19)28(20-6-10-22(32)11-7-20)36(29)30(38)35-15-14-33-26(37)17-35/h4-13,16,18,27-28H,14-15,17H2,1-3H3,(H,33,37)/t27-,28+/m1/s1 Key: BDUHCSBCVGXTJM-IZLXSDGUSA-N
- SMILES: CC(C)OC1=C(C=CC(=C1)OC)C2=NC(C(N2C(=O)N3CCNC(=O)C3)C4=CC=C(C=C4)Cl)C5=CC=C(C=C5)Cl

Properties
Chemical formula	C_{30}H_{30}Cl_{2}N_{4}O_{4}
Molar mass	581.49 g·mol^{−1}
- Except where otherwise noted, data are given for materials in their standard state (at 25 °C [77 °F], 100 kPa). verify (what is ?) Infobox references

Nutlins are a family of small molecule, cis-imidazoline analogs, which inhibit the interaction between MDM2 and tumor suppressor p53, stabilizing p53 and triggering cell death and senescence. Three nutlins were discovered in the initial small molecule screen (nutlin-1, nutlin-2, and nutlin-3), but nutlin-3 is most commonly used in anti-cancer studies. Nutlins disrupt the p53–MDM2 interaction by occupying a p53-binding pocket of MDM2. Many tumors that express normal p53 and normal or elevated levels of MDM2 may be targeted using nutlin. Nutlin-3 acts quickly in vitro, leading to increased levels of p53 protein within minutes.

The more potent of the two enantiomers, nutlin-3a ((–)-nutlin-3), can be synthesized in a highly enantioselective fashion. Several derivatives of nutlin, such as RG7112 and RG7388 (Idasanutlin) have been developed and progressed into human studies, but have not yet shown improved survival and may cause toxicity. Imidazoline core based on the methoxyphenyl substituents also stabilizes p53. Since its discovery in 2003, the nutlin core has been modified to obtain molecules with additional properties, such as increased solubility, irreversible MDM2 inhibitors, improved binding to MDMX, the PROTAC methodology, dual-action molecules, and fluorescent probes.
