= IMes =

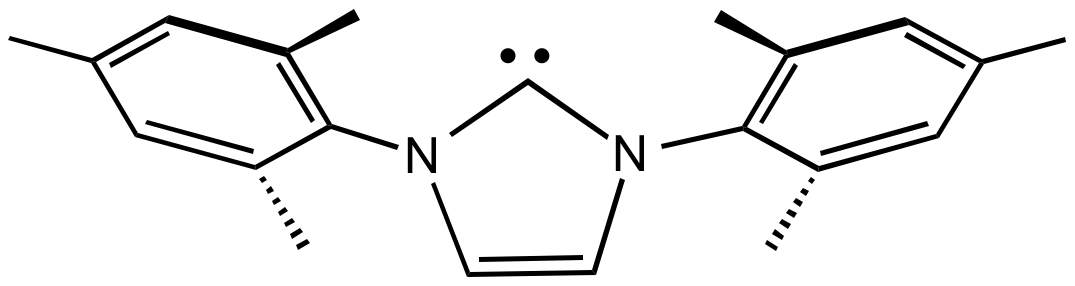

Names
- Preferred IUPAC name 1,3-Bis(2,4,6-trimethylphenyl)-1,3-dihydro-2H-imidazol-2-ylidene
- Other names 1,3-Dimesitylimidazol-2-ylidene, 1,3-bis(2,4,6-trimethylphenyl)-imidazolium, 1,3-bis(2,4,6-trimethylphenyl)imidazol-2-ylidene

Identifiers
CAS Number	141556-42-5
3D model (JSmol)	Interactive image
ChemSpider	9298886
ECHA InfoCard	100.154.201
PubChem CID	11123757
CompTox Dashboard (EPA)	DTXSID70456010
- InChI: InChI=1S/C21H24N2/c1-14-9-16(3)20(17(4)10-14)22-7-8-23(13-22)21-18(5)11-15(2)12-19(21)6/h7-12H,1-6H3 Key: JCYWCSGERIELPG-UHFFFAOYSA-N; InChI=1/C21H24N2/c1-14-9-16(3)20(17(4)10-14)22-7-8-23(13-22)21-18(5)11-15(2)12-19(21)6/h7-12H,1-6H3 Key: JCYWCSGERIELPG-UHFFFAOYAJ
- SMILES: Cc1cc(c(c(c1)C)N2C=CN([C]2)c3c(cc(cc3C)C)C)C

Properties
Chemical formula	C_{21}H_{24}N_{2}
Molar mass	304.43
Appearance	white solid
Melting point	150 to 155 °C (302 to 311 °F; 423 to 428 K)
- Except where otherwise noted, data are given for materials in their standard state (at 25 °C [77 °F], 100 kPa). Infobox references

IMes is an abbreviation for an organic compound that is a common ligand in organometallic chemistry. It is an N-heterocyclic carbene (NHC). The compound, a white solid, is often not isolated but instead is generated upon attachment to the metal centre.

First prepared by Anthony J. Arduengo, the heterocycle is synthesized by condensation of 2,4,6-trimethylaniline and glyoxal to give the diimine. In the presence of acid, the resulting glyoxal-bis(mesitylimine) condenses with formaldehyde to give the dimesitylimidazolium cation. This cation is the conjugate acid of the NHC.

== Related compounds ==
Bulkier than IMes is the NHC ligand IPr (CAS 244187-81-3). IPr features diisopropylphenyl in place of the mesityl substituents.

Some variants of IMes and IPr have saturated backbones, two such ligands are SIMes and SIPr. They are prepared by alkylation of substituted anilines with dibromoethane followed by ring closure and dehydrohalogenation of the dihydroimidazolium salt.

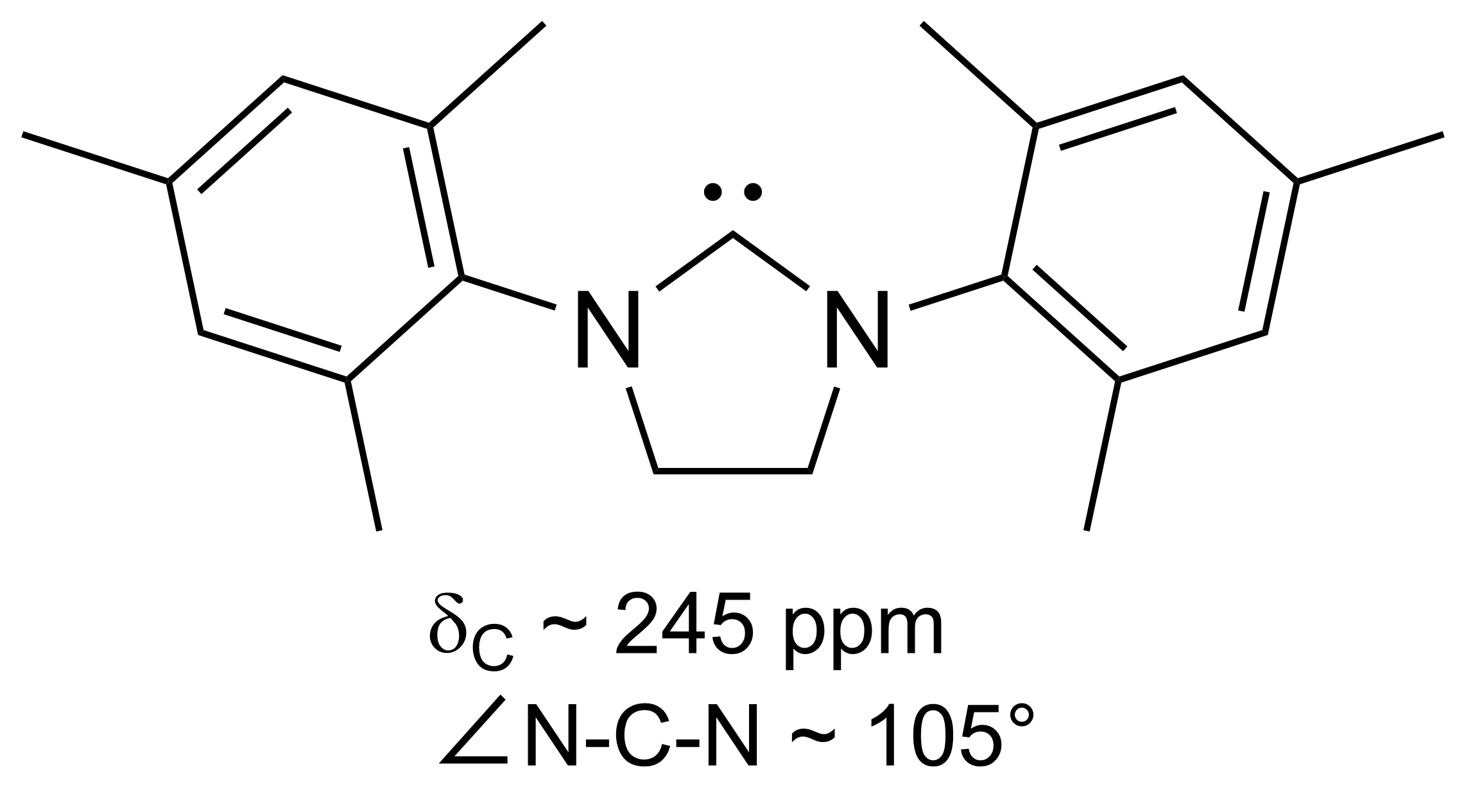
SIMes is a popular NHC ligand with a more flexible backbone compared to IMes
