= Edward M. Burgess =

American chemist (1934–2018)

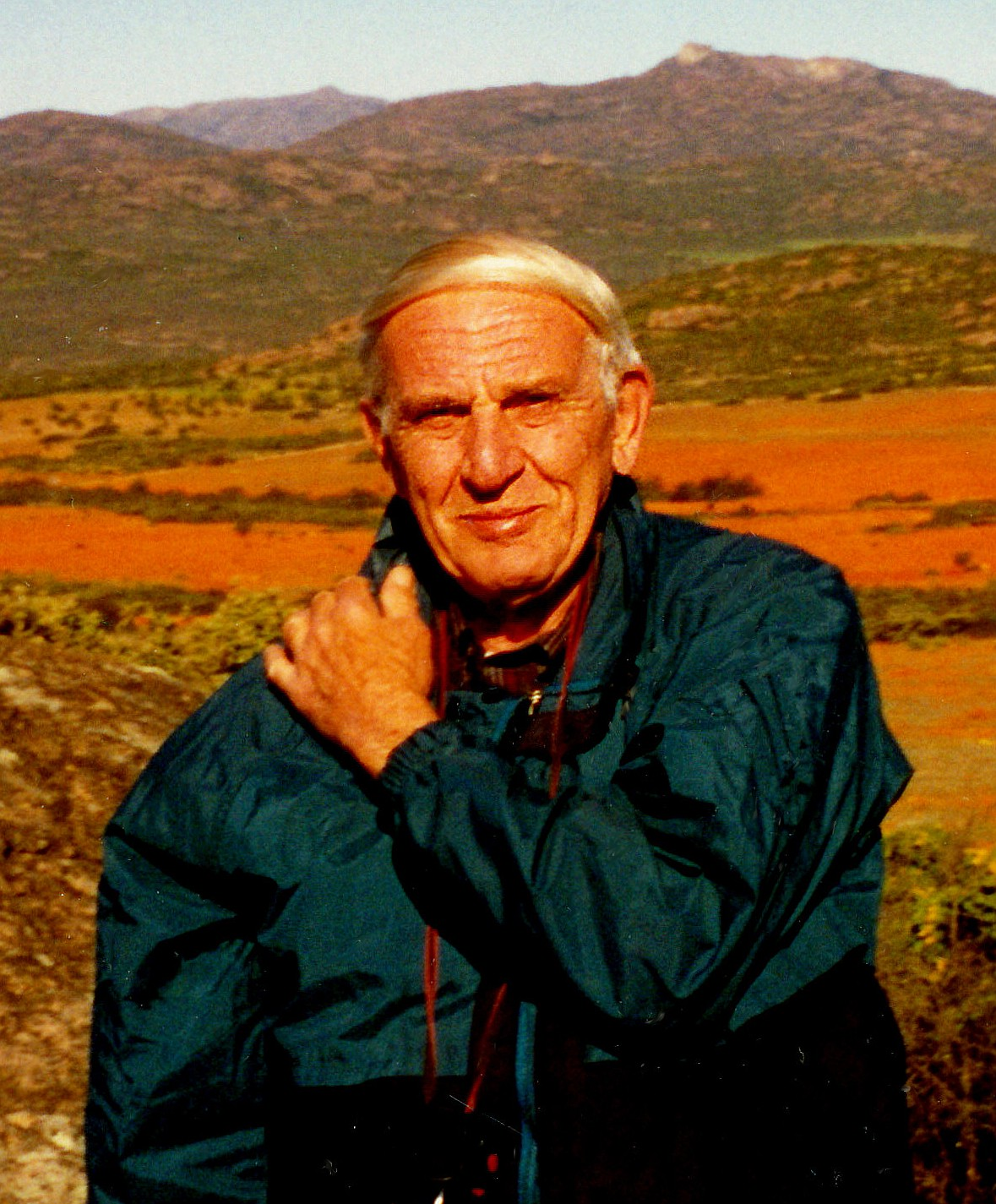
- September 2001; Namaqualand, South Africa
- Born: June 8, 1934; Birmingham, Alabama, U.S.
- Died: June 24, 2018 (aged 84); St. Augustine, Florida, U.S.
- Education: Auburn University; Massachusetts Institute of Technology
- Known for: Burgess Reagent
- Scientific career
- Fields: Organic chemistry
- Workplaces: Yale University; Georgia Institute of Technology
- Thesis: Photochemical isomerization of eucarvone and cyclooctatrienone: studies toward the synthesis of samandarin (1962)
- Doctoral advisor: George Büchi
- Doctoral students: Anthony Joseph Arduengo III

Edward Meredith Burgess (June 8, 1934 – June 24, 2018) was an American chemist. He specialized in organic chemistry with an emphasis on methodology, structure, and photochemistry. He is best known for the Burgess reagent (methyl N-(triethylammoniumsulfonyl)carbamate) that is used for selective dehydration of alcohols.

Professor Burgess served as Secretary-Treasurer of the Organic Division of the American Chemical Society from 1974 to 1977.

== Biography ==
Edward Meredith Burgess was born in Birmingham, Alabama in 1934. He attended Shades Valley High School in that city and was awarded the school's science award upon graduation in 1951. During the summers of his junior and senior high school years he obtained a job performing routine chores at the University of Alabama at Birmingham (UAB) Department of Biochemistry. It was during this period at UAB that Burgess began his career in chemical research. Under the guidance of the noted carbohydrate chemist, William Ward Pigman, he was given his own research project, the “Anhydrous Reaction of Nitrogen Dioxide with some Selected Sugars.”

In 1952, Burgess was awarded an NROTC scholarship and entered Auburn University with a dual major in chemistry and physics. During his undergraduate years at Auburn he undertook research in the laboratories of Frank Stevens (Chemistry) on the Synthesis of Indole Derivatives useful as Plant Growth Regulators and Howard Carr (Physics) on the construction of a mass spectrometer. He obtained his B.Sc. degree (cum laude) in 1956.

From 1956 to 1959, Burgess served as an officer aboard the US Navy destroyer, USS Stormes (DD-780), a ship assigned to both the U.S. Atlantic and Mediterranean fleets.

== Research ==
=== Graduate research ===
As a graduate student in the Büchi group at the Massachusetts Institute of Technology, Burgess's research focused largely on synthetic organic chemistry and photochemistry. His doctoral dissertation was titled “Photochemical isomerization of eucarvone and cyclooctatrienone; Studies toward the synthesis of samandarin.” An interest in photochemistry and synthetic methodology would mark many of Burgess's contributions to chemistry. In addition to his publications with Professor Büchi connected with his dissertation, Burgess also published independently on the epoxidation of cholestadienone.

Eucarvone from Burgess's Ph.D. dissertation. external viewer.

Cycloocta-2,4,6-trien-1-one from Burgess's Ph.D. Dissertation.

Cyclooctatetraene epoxide from Burgess's Ph.D. Dissertation.

Samandarin the target steroidal alkaloid from Burgess's Ph.D. Dissertation.

4,5β-Epoxycholest-1-en-3-one from Burgess's independent work in the Büchi laboratory.
