= Palladium–NHC complex =

Family of organopalladium compounds

[(NHC)Pd(allyl)Cl] complex.

In organometallic chemistry, palladium-NHC complexes are a family of organopalladium compounds in which palladium forms a coordination complex with N-heterocyclic carbenes (NHCs). They have been investigated for applications in homogeneous catalysis, particularly cross-coupling reactions.

== Synthesis ==
The synthesis of Pd-NHC complexes follows the methods used for the synthesis of transition metal NHC complexes. The synthesis of Pd-NHC complexes can also be achieved through substitution of a labile ligand L in a Pd-L complex. Labile ligands typically include cyclooctadiene, dibenzylideneacetone, bridging halides, or phosphines. This process can be used in conjunction with the in situ generation of free carbenes. Pd-NHC complexes can also be synthesized through transmetalation with silver-NHC complexes. The transmetallated NHCs can either be isolated for subsequent reaction with palladium in a two-step method, or generated in the presence of palladium in a one-pot reaction. However, generation of Pd-NHC complexes by Ag transmetallation is cost-prohibitive and hampered by Ag complexes’ light sensitivity.

== Pd-NHC complexes in catalytic cross-coupling ==
Pd-NHC complexes are catalysts for Suzuki-Miyaura, Negishi, Sonogashira, Kumada-Tamao-Corriu, Hiyama, and Stille cross-coupling. Compared to the corresponding Pd-phosphine catalysts, Pd-NHC catalysts can be faster, exhibit broader substrate scope, all with higher turnover numbers.

=== Suzuki-Miyaura cross-coupling ===
In Suzuki-Miyaura cross-couplings, the traditional coupling partners are organobromides and organoboron compounds. While Suzuki-Miyaura cross-couplings typically employ organobromides as coupling partners, organochlorides are more desirable electrophiles due to their lower cost. The sluggish reactivity of the C-Cl bond is often a problem. With the advent of Pd-NHC complexes, organochlorides have emerged as viable partners in Suzuki-Miyaura cross coupling.

=== Negishi coupling ===
The use of NHC-Pd-PEPPSI complexes in Negishi cross-coupling has resulted in high turnover numbers and turnover frequencies. Additionally, NHC-Pd complexes can be used to couple sp3 centers to sp3 centers in higher yield than their non-NHC Pd analogs. However, studies of Pd-NHC complexes and their utility in Negishi coupling are currently lacking despite these promising results.

=== Sonogashira coupling ===
Pd-NHC complexes used in Sonogashira cross-coupling effect temperature stability in the complex. As in other Pd-NHC mediated cross-coupling reactions, the use of Pd-NHC complexes also allow higher turnover numbers than their NHC-free counterparts. NHC-palladacycles permit copper-free Sonogashira reactions to be carried out.

=== Heck-Mizoroki coupling ===
The use of Pd-NHC complexes in Heck-Mizoroki cross-coupling permits the use of cheaper, ample supplies of aryl chloride substrates. Additionally, the activity and stability of the catalyst in Heck-Mizoroki coupling can be enhanced by adjusting the 1,3 substituents on the imidazole ring.
