= Glyoxal-bis(mesitylimine) =

Names
- IUPAC name 2,4,6-Trimethyl-N-[(2E)-2-[(2,4,6-trimethylphenyl)imino]ethylidene]aniline

Identifiers
CAS Number	647032-09-5; 56222-36-7 (non-specific)
3D model (JSmol)	Interactive image
ChemSpider	2971578
PubChem CID	3741651
UNII	SC7SFP5T49
CompTox Dashboard (EPA)	DTXSID00395802
- InChI: InChI=1S/C20H24N2/c1-13-9-15(3)19(16(4)10-13)21-7-8-22-20-17(5)11-14(2)12-18(20)6/h7-12H,1-6H3/b21-7+,22-8+ Key: YVKAJRYLHIECOK-KVJLFNRQSA-N
- SMILES: CC1=CC(C)=C(\N=C\C=N\C2=C(C)C=C(C)C=C2C)C(C)=C1

Properties
Chemical formula	C_{20}H_{24}N_{2}
Molar mass	292.426 g·mol^{−1}
Appearance	Yellow solid
- Except where otherwise noted, data are given for materials in their standard state (at 25 °C [77 °F], 100 kPa). Infobox references

Glyoxal-bis(mesitylimine) is an organic compound with the formula H_{2}C_{2}(NC_{6}H_{2}Me_{3})_{2} (Me = methyl). It is a yellow solid that is soluble in organic solvents. It is classified as a diimine ligand. It is used in coordination chemistry and homogeneous catalysis. It is synthesized by condensation of 2,4,6-trimethylaniline and glyoxal. In addition to its direct use as a ligand, it is a precursor to imidazole precursors to the popular NHC ligand called IMes.

== Related compounds ==
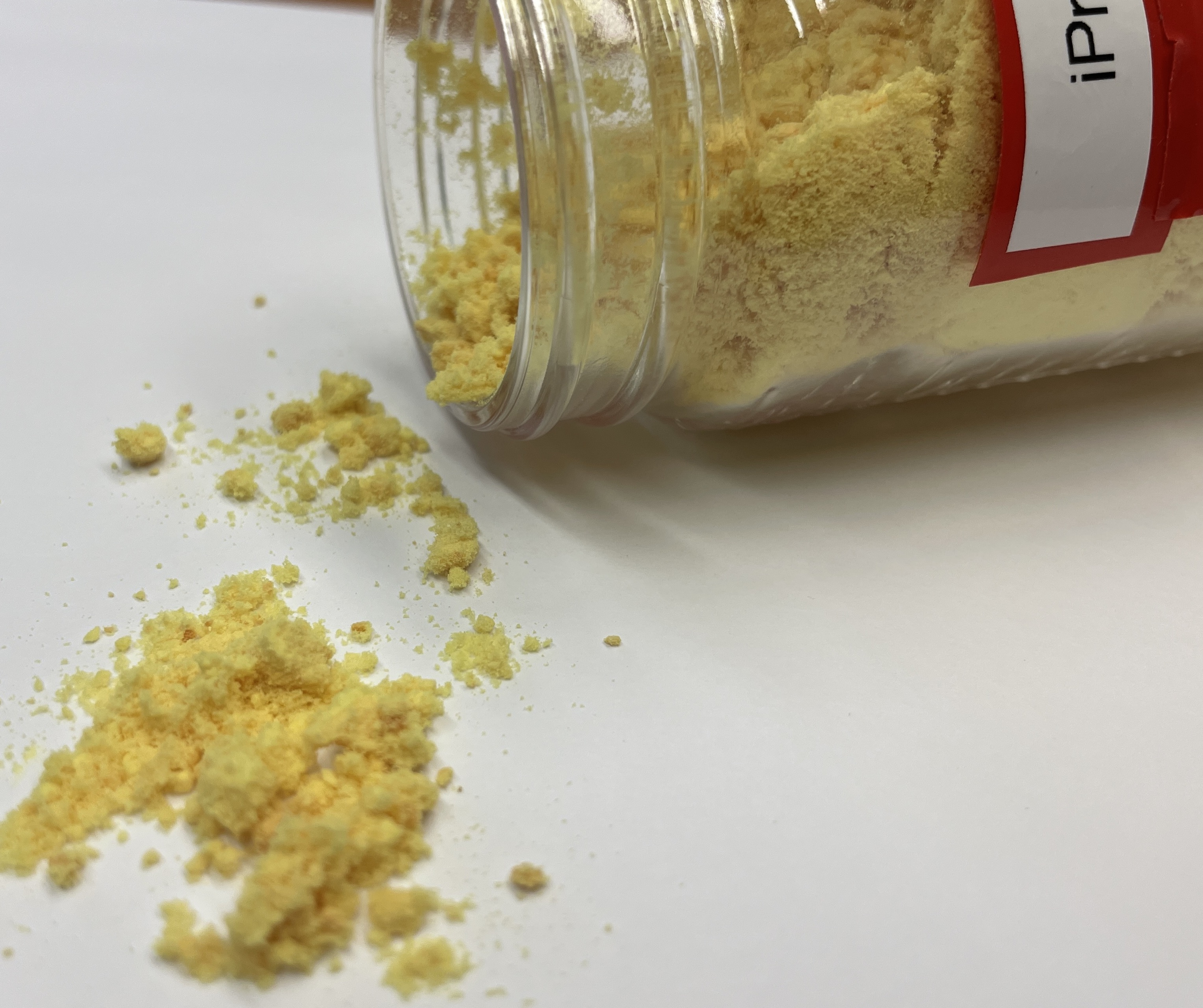
Sample of alpha-diimine derived from 2,6-diisopropylaniline and glyoxal.

- Glyoxal-bis(triisopropylphenylimine), which is bulkier than glyoxal-bis(mesitylimine).
