= Burgess reagent =

Names
- IUPAC name 1-Methoxy-N-triethylammoniosulfonyl-methanimidate

Identifiers
| CAS Number | 29684-56-8 |
| 3D model (JSmol) | Interactive image |
| ChemSpider | 2007108 |
| ECHA InfoCard | 100.157.812 |
| EC Number | 629-648-8 |
| PubChem CID | 2724994 |
| UNII | H5HBH02LFX |
| CompTox Dashboard (EPA) | DTXSID90894112 |
- InChI: InChI=1/C8H18N2O4S/c1-5-10(6-2,7-3)15(12,13)9-8(11)14-4/h5-7H2,1-4H3 Key: YSHOWEKUVWPFNR-UHFFFAOYAN
- SMILES: O=S(=O)(N=C([O-])OC)[N+](CC)(CC)CC

Properties
| Chemical formula | C_{8}H_{18}N_{2}O_{4}S |
| Molar mass | 238.30 g·mol^{−1} |

Hazards
- GHS labelling
| Pictograms | (GHS07: Exclamation mark) |
| Signal word | Warning |
| Hazard statements | H315, H319, H335 |
| Precautionary statements | P261, P264, P271, P280, P302+P352, P304+P340, P305+P351+P338, P312, P321, P332+P313, P337+P313, P362, P403+P233, P405, P501 |
- Except where otherwise noted, data are given for materials in their standard state (at 25 °C [77 °F], 100 kPa). Infobox references

The Burgess reagent (methyl N-(triethylammoniumsulfonyl)carbamate) is a mild and selective zwitterionic dehydrating reagent used in organic chemistry. It was developed in the laboratory of Edward M. Burgess at Georgia Tech.

The Burgess reagent is used to convert secondary and tertiary alcohols with an adjacent proton into alkenes. Dehydration of primary alcohols does not work well. The reagent is soluble in common organic solvents and alcohol dehydration takes place with syn elimination through an intramolecular elimination reaction. A general mechanism is shown below:

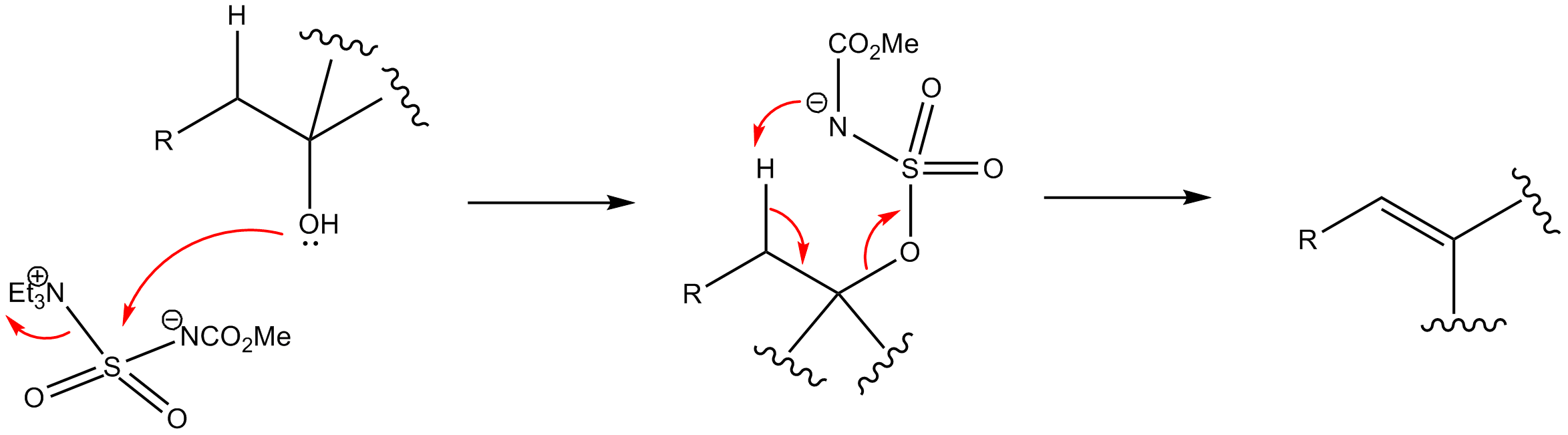

== Preparation ==
The reagent is prepared from chlorosulfonylisocyanate by stepwise reaction with methanol and triethylamine in warm benzene, all reagents and solvents must be kept anhydrous:

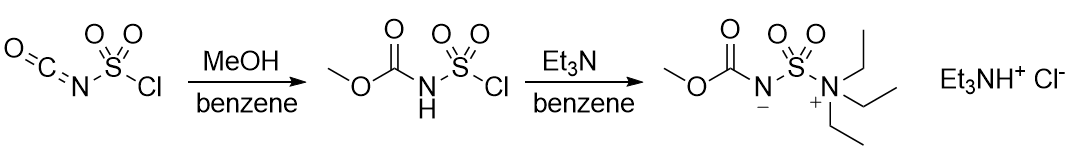
