= Cyclic iron tetra N-heterocyclic carbenes =

Class of organometallic complexes

Cyclic iron tetra N-heterocyclic carbenes are a family of organometallic complexes that are unique in their steric and electronic tunability. This is because the iron is linked directly to four carbon atoms in its equator which belong to the highly tunable N-heterocyclic carbene (NHC) ligand system. The ligands that are attached to the iron center can be modified to change the neighboring chemical environment of the iron. This allows researchers to tune the reactivity and the electronic configuration of the iron and study reaction intermediates that are relevant to important chemical conversions or can lead to new catalyst designs.

Their structure can be summarized as a transition metal carbene complex in which the central atom is iron, and one of the ligands is a cyclic tetracarbene made up of four N-heterocyclic carbene (NHCs) subunits linked together. NHCs are a subcategory of carbene ligands in which a carbon atom has two unbound electrons in their isolated form. These are donated to the metal center to form a dative bond in the final complex. When an NHC is bound to a metal center, its steric environment (their bulkiness), as well as the delocalized electrons of their 5-membered heterocyclic structure can directly influence the reactivity of the metal center.

An example macrocyclic irom tetracarbene complex

They structurally resemble the heme molecule that is found in the protein hemoglobin in our bloodstream, but their chemical properties are very different. The four carbene moieties act as strong σ-donors and weak π-acceptors due to the presence of two adjacent nitrogen atoms donating electron density into the empty p orbital of the carbene carbon (mesomeric / resonance effects). This means that the carbon atom, unlike the nitrogen atom that is directly bound to the iron in heme, cannot accept electrons from the iron center back towards the macrocycle. More electron density is donated to the iron center compared to heme from the ligand. This is because singlet carbene is additionally stabilized inductively by the neighboring more electronegative nitrogen atom, as well as the cyclic geometry of the NHC which forces an sp^{2} type hybridized orbital configuration.

== Comparing the Iron-tetracarbene and Heme Complexes ==
Illustration comparing the bonding observed in an example neutral iron-tetracarbene complex and heme B (iron protoporphyrin IX). Crystal structure obtained from www.rcsb.org and Intrinsic Atomic Orbital produced using Orca & IBOView.org.

In the literature, cyclic NHC tetracarbenes are described as heme analogues because they are structurally similar. However, the difference in their chemistry is understood by considering the covalency of their bonding as assigned by the Covalent Bond Classification (CBC) method. NHCs are L type ligands making the tetracarbene an L_{4} type ligand whereas porphyrins are L_{2}X_{2}. This means that electrons on the iron contribute more to bonding in heme. This is in contrast to the tetracarbene, where they are mostly localized on the iron as illustrated in the figure above.

Electronically, the difference stems from the binding modes between the pyrrole subunits that make up the porphyrins such as heme, and their network of delocalized electrons that span the macrocyclic ligand. This additional communication with a delocalized electron system does not exist in the NHC tetracarbene. A direct chemical outcome of this can be seen in the redox chemistry of the tetracarbene, where one electron reduction and oxidation mostly happens at the iron itself. This is because the lack of π -back-bonding between the iron center and the macrocyclic carbene as a result of the chemistry of the NHC ligand. This is in contrast to the heme complex, where the ligand has 18 π-electrons in a cyclic aromatic system that is directly coordinated to the iron via the nitrogen atoms. In many porphyrins, any one-electron redox chemistry that occurs to produce a radical cation or anion can be readily stabilized via delocalization to the ligand itself. They are thought to be ubiquitous as intermediates in enzymatic cycles.

The strong σ-donation of the four NHC ligands make high-spin configurations less favorable as well as pushing the d_{x2-y2} orbital above the d_{z2}. Additionally, many cyclic tetracarbene examples in the literature with an iron(II) center have a +2 change, whereas heme-iron(II) complex is neutral due to the -2 change of the ligand itself. Macrocyclic imidazolylborane derived NHC tetracarbene visualized above is an exception to this and is thought to resemble heme more closely.

Iron Centered Intrinsic Bonding Orbitals (IBOs) of an 18-atom Ringed Tetracarbene (adapted from)
| Iron(III) cyclic NHC Tetracarbene Bound to a Cl- Ligand axially | Iron(III) cyclic NHC Tetracarbene Bound to a Cl- Ligand axially - dxy orbital | Iron(III) cyclic NHC Tetracarbene Bound to a Cl- Ligand axially - dxz orbital |
| LFe(III)Cl^{2+} | d_{xy} | d_{xz} |
| Iron(III) cyclic NHC Tetracarbene Bound to a Cl- Ligand axially - dyz orbital | Iron(III) cyclic NHC Tetracarbene Bound to a Cl- Ligand axially - dz2 orbital | |
| dyz | dz^{2} | d_{x2-y2} |

Due to these electronic properties, as well as the tunable structural environment of the tetradentate NHC carbene ligand a variety of reactivity with the cyclic tetra NHC carbene iron complexes has been achieved. This includes C-H activation, CO_{2} reduction, aziridation and epoxidation catalysis as well as the stabilization of rare iron(III) and iron (iv) species.

== Synthesizing the Complex ==
The first example of a tetracarbene complex was created using metal-templated cyclization. This means that the metal center acted as a template itself where the pieces of the cycle could bind first, then link-up like puzzle pieces to give the final tetracarbene. This is illustrated in the figure below as first demonstrated for platinum(II) by Hahn and Duc Le Van group in 2005. However, the now common way to synthesize a tetracabene is constructing the macrocyclic imidazolium salt followed by its complexation to the metal of interest due to its ease and generalizability to different metal precursors.

Templated cyclic NHC tetracarbene Pt complex synthesis as seen in

=== The Macrocyclic NHC Ligand ===
The discovery of the iron tetracarbene complexes was possible due to the synthesis of suitable tetracarbene precursors. These were imidazolyl salts, which could subsequently be deprotonated to produce the ligand of interest.

Researchers were interested in these salts as they had a positively charged, crown-ether-like cavity capable of binding anions selectively. First macrocyclic imidazolylboranes were discovered by Walter Siebert (2000, 2003) and his colleagues during the synthesis of polymeric structures of 1-imidazolyl-diethylborane and 1-imidazolyl-diphenylborane. From the mixture of oligomers, alongside various lengths of chained up products, macrocycles were isolated by column chromatography and characterized by X-ray Diffraction (XRD). Additional tetrakis imidazolium varieties, where the four imidazolium subunits were linked together were synthesized by Takamichi Yamagishi in 2003 by joining two-membered bis-imidazolyl fragments with a durene instead of a borane, and Kwang S. Kim and his colleagues in 2005 who used a pyridine to interlink the bis-imidazolyl moieties. The size of the cavity could be engineered by choosing the bis-imidazolyl and the linking portions of the macrocycle carefully. This was realized by Paul D. Beer and his colleagues in 2005, who used benzimidazole precursors stitched together with dibromo- and diiodoalkanes of different lengths to obtain (tetrakis)imidazolium macrocyclic receptor systems. The figure below provides example approaches in that are used to synthesize the imidazolium salt precursor to the ligand.

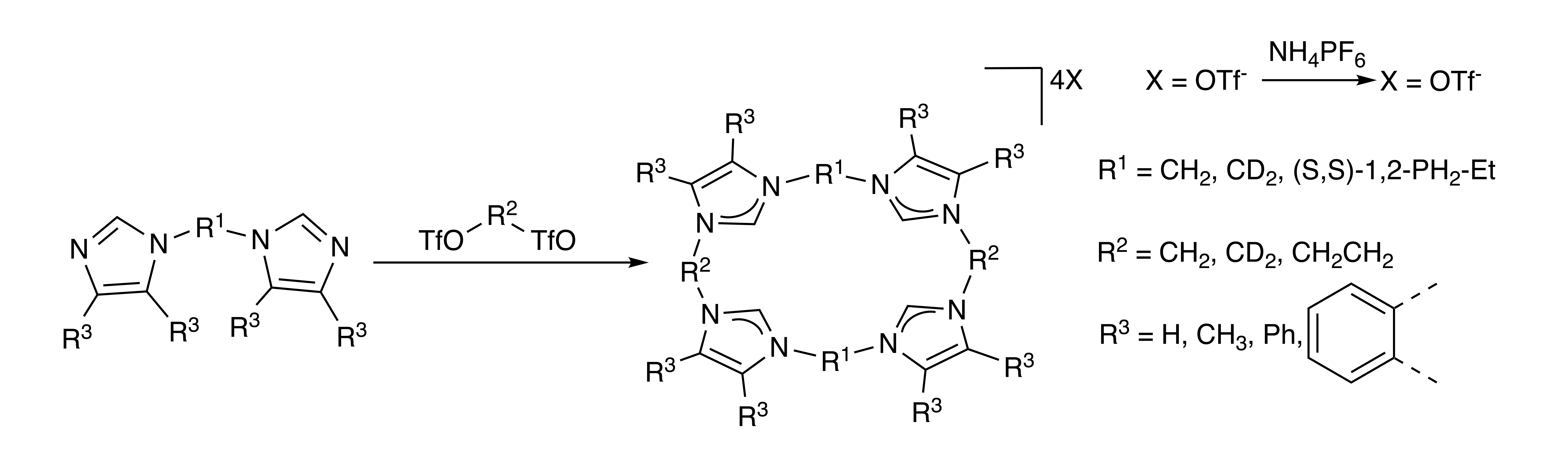
Scheme summarizing Imdazolyl based tetracarbene precursor synthesis adapted from

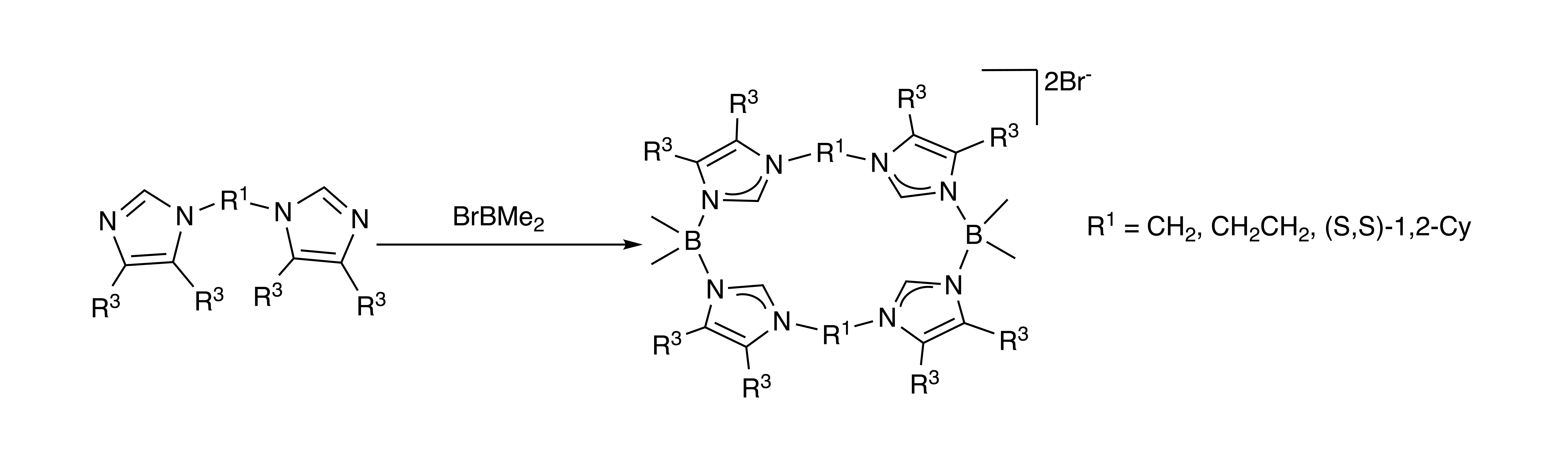
Scheme summarizing Imdazolylborane based tetracarbene precursor synthesis adapted from

=== Combining the NHC tetracarbene and a metal precursor ===
Deprotonation of imidazolium salts to produce kinetically stable persistent carbenes is a widely adopted synthesis and therefore became the main reaction with which tetracarbenes are synthesized.

Wanzlick and his group's work in the 1970s had showcased that imidazolium salts could be deprotonated to get intermediate imidazol-2-ylidene carbenes, and they were able to isolate their coordination compounds. This led to the eventual crystallization of a persistent NHC by Arduengo obtained through the same methodology. The bulky adamentyl substituents on the nitrogen atoms provided kinetic stabilization affording the ability to crystallize them. This steric tunability is an advantage of incorporating the NHC structure to a ligand.

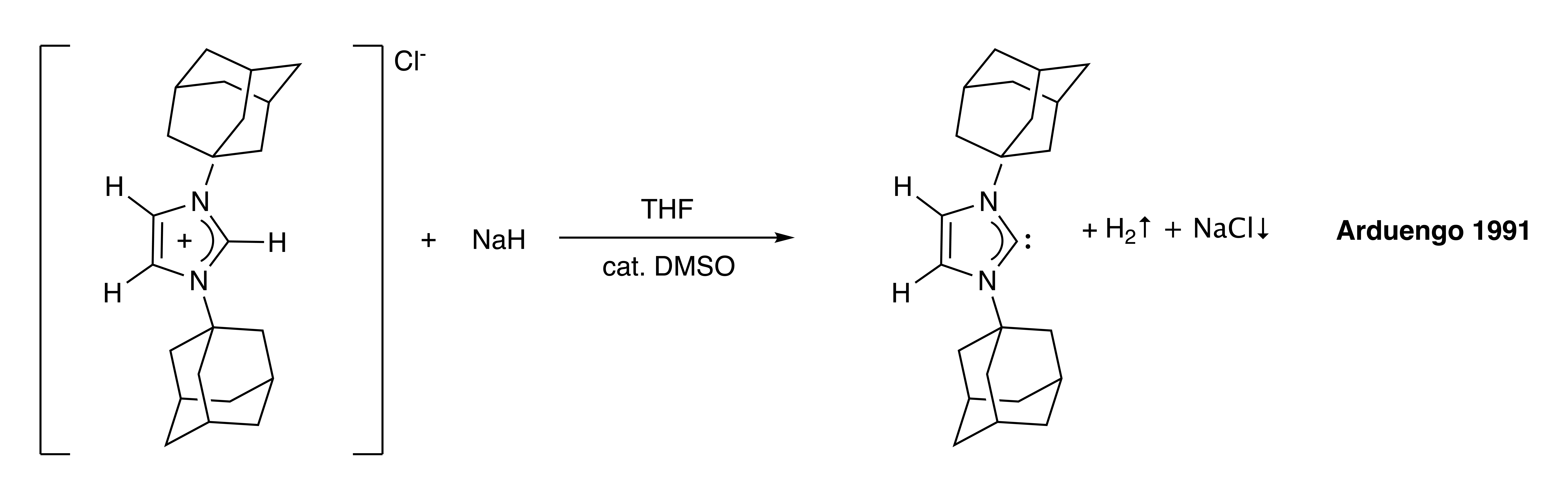
Arduengo's 1991 persistent carbene synthesis

In 2007, Murphy, Sheng-ze Zhou and colleagues used this intuition to synthesize the first metal N-heterocyclic carbenes from a macrocyclic tetraimidozolium precursor via a similar deprotonation. As a result of the 24-atom-ringed tetra imidazolium ligand, both monomeric structures with Pd and Co and dimeric structures with Cu and Ag were obtained, as seen in the crystal structures below.

Imidazoliumsalt animated CCDC 644574

24-atom-ringed tetra imidazolium ligand derived Pd tetracarbene complex made by Murphy et al. 2007

Dimeric copper NHC macrocycle complex based on CCDC 644575

Note that none of these structures represent an equatorial arrangement of the carbenes on a flat plane. This is because the 24-atom ring they used was too flexible to restrict the ligand to the planar geometry. The equatorial arrangement would allow for reactive open sites on the axial axes. In 2010, Jenkins and his group synthesized an 18-atom-ringed, less flexible version that provided the foundation for the more controlled design of monomeric tetra-carbene complexes of a variety of metals including iron.

The common approach to the synthesis of the tetracarbene complexes became the synthesis of the tetracarbene ligand followed by its complexation to the metal atom of interest. The main methods to synthesize the ligands and the complexes as compiled from literature by Schlachta and Kühn are provided below.

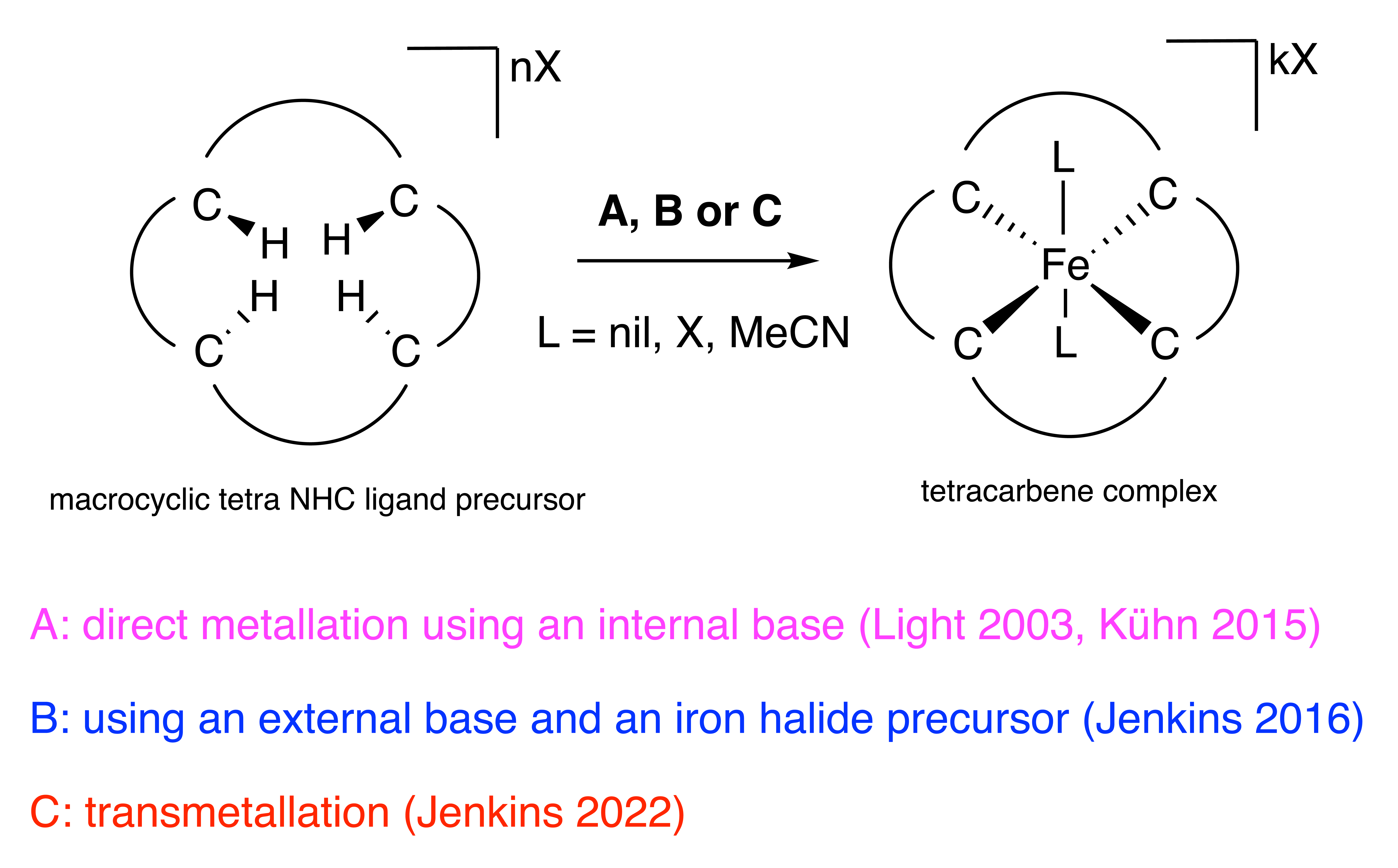
General methodology to synthesize iron tetracarbenes from corresponding imidazolium salts, adapted from

The first method involves using an iron precursor in which the counter anion is a strong enough base that can readily deprotonate the NHC precursor salt and form the complex. This method allows for the precursor salt to be converted into the tetracarbene ligand, and the complexation to occur using only a single reagent added to the imidazolium salt.

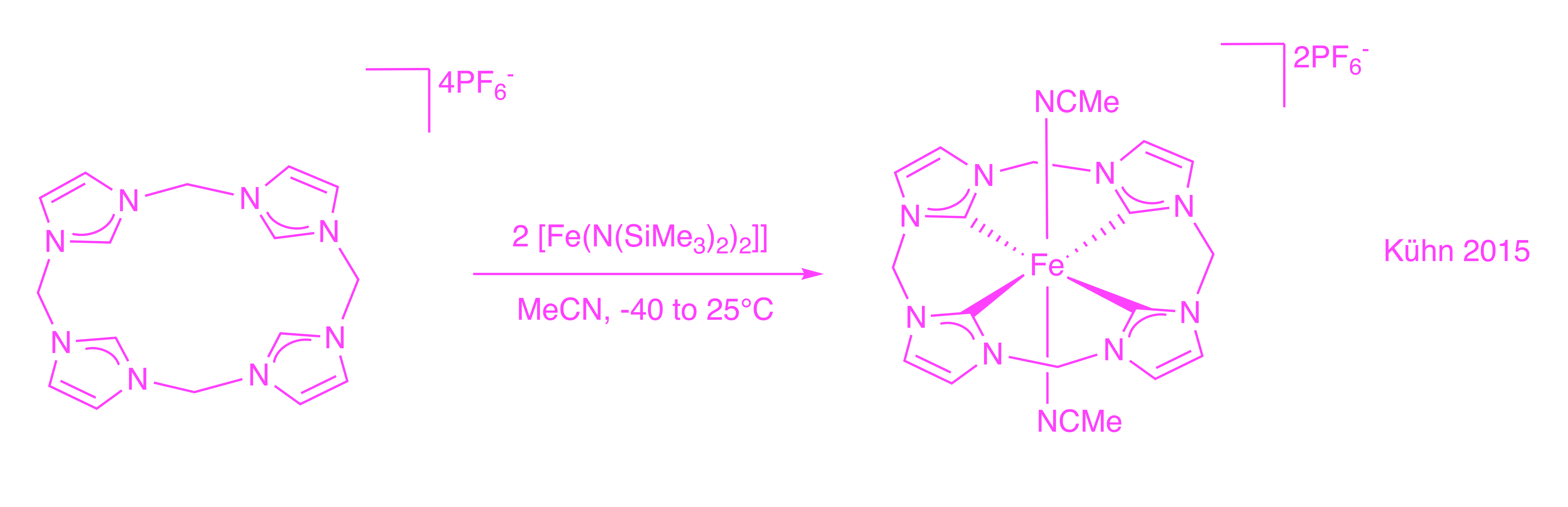
Using an internal base (anion in the iron precursor) to deprotonate the salt and prepare the tetracarbene complex.

In some cases, the base that is the counter-ion in the metal precursor is not strong enough to deprotonate the carbene precursor. For these cases, an external base and an iron halide precursor with the intended oxidation state can be used. If an iron(III) bromide is used, the reaction produces a cyclic iron NHC tetracarbene with a Br- ligand as an axial ligand. This can be removed by using sodium amalgam to reduce the iron center.

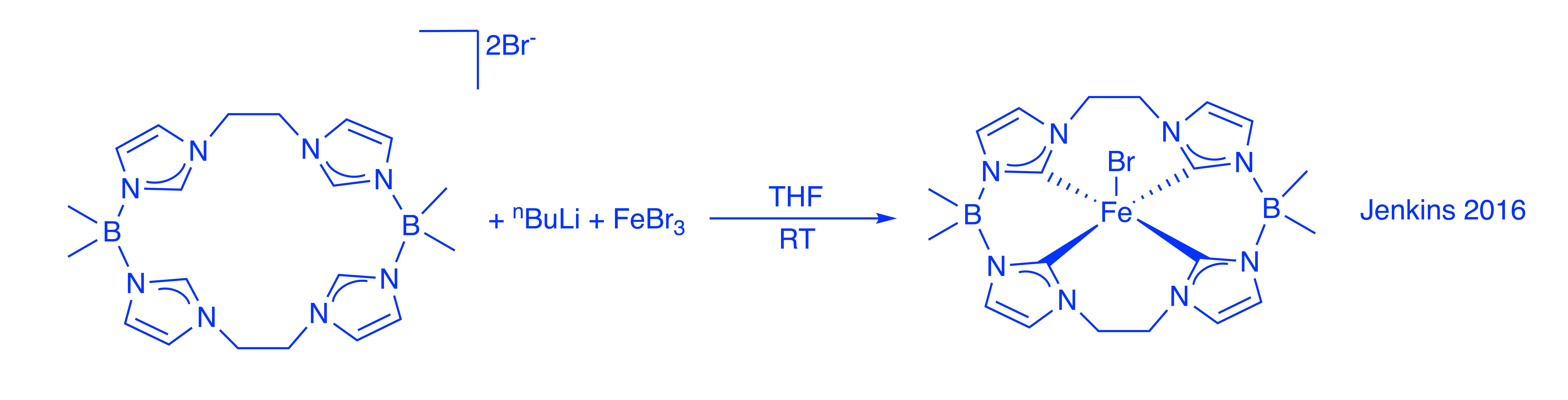
An external base can be used to deprotonate the imidazolium salt before complexing an iron(II) or iron(III) supplied by the corresponding iron halide.

A third which is less common is to form a carbene complex as a precursor on another metal, followed by transmetallation to an iron halide precursor.

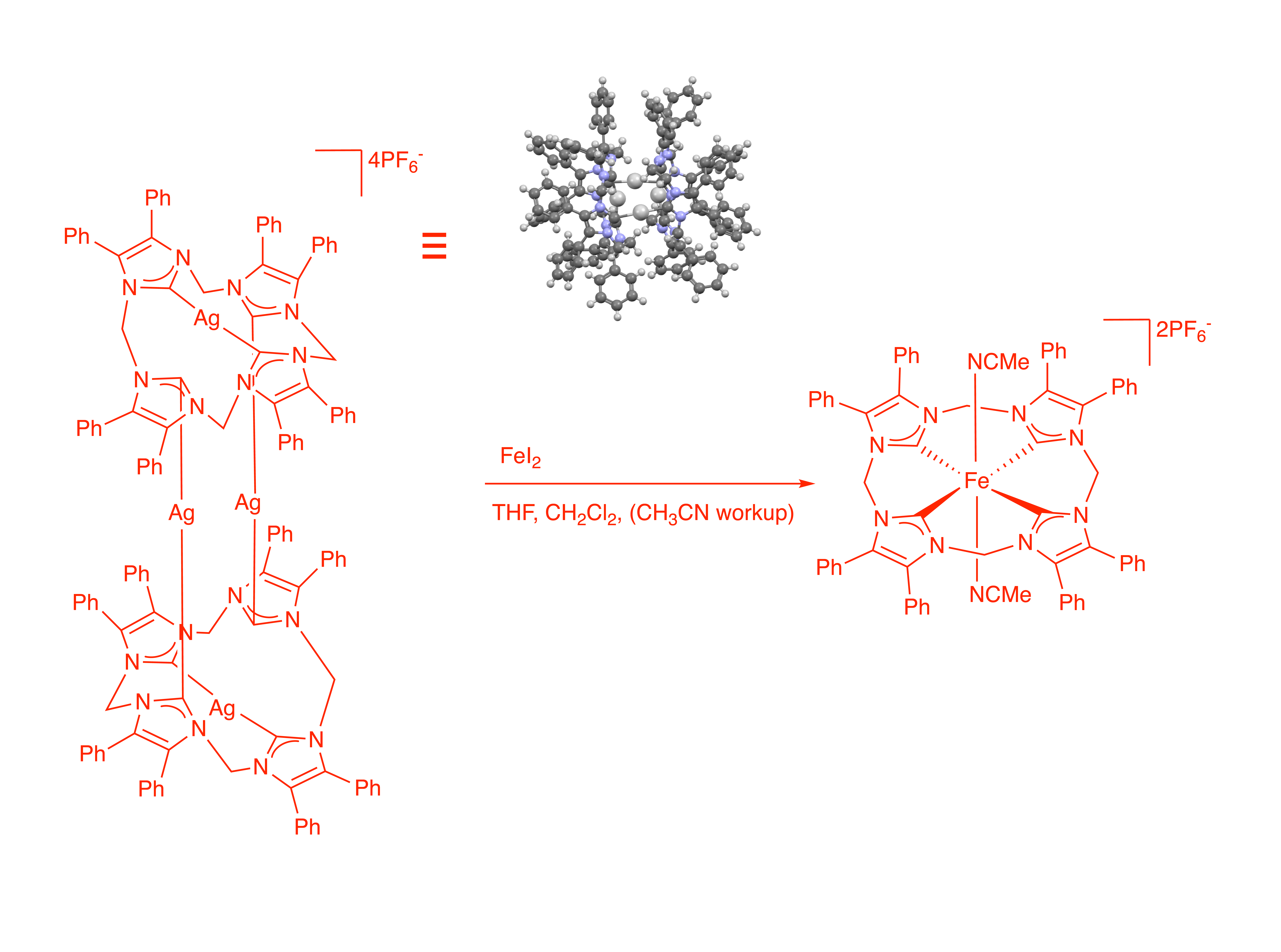
Transmetallation based carbene complex synthesis by Jenkins 2022

== Reactivity ==
A more extensive list of cyclic iron(II) and iron(III) tetracarbenes in literature was compiled by Schlachta and Kühn in a review in 2023. Most of them are obtained as a result of the complexation methodology highlighted in the previous section, or the reduction or oxidation of the molecule of interest. In this section, a few ways in which the iron-tetracarbene complexes react are highlighted.

=== Axial-ligand Exchange ===
The axial ligands can be exchanged for others, allowing access to a plethora of spin states.

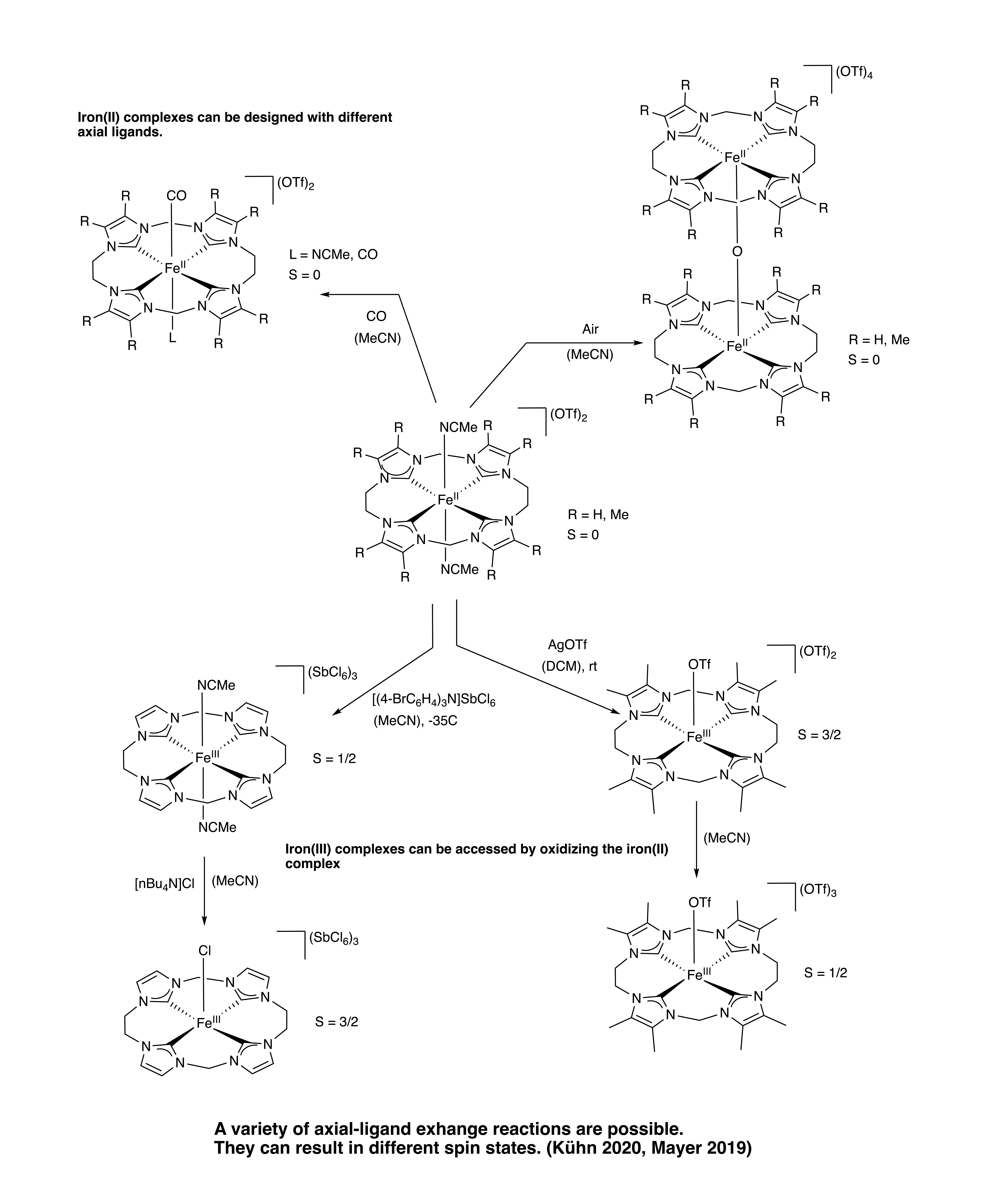
Example axial-ligand exchange reactions of iron NHC tetracarbene complexes (Kühn 2020, Meyer 2019)

=== Catalysis ===
The iron tetracarbene complexes were found to be active as electrochemical CO_{2} reduction catalysts in which CO_{2} is converted to the industrially relevant feedstock CO, aziridation catalysts to synthesize organic azide pharmaceutical precursor molecules and epoxidation catalysts to convert alkenes into reactive epoxides.

These mechanisms appear to benefit from the variable oxidation state of the metal center, allowing for substrates to attach and detach, and the reactivity is tunable by directly changing the "backbone" or the general structure of the NHC carbene, as envisioned above. This can lead to improved yields, reaction rates, as well as selectivities, therefore demonstrating a benefit of choosing the tetracarbene platform to target industrially relevant reactivities.

As an illustrative example for an industrially relevant application, the following simplified reaction mechanism proposed for electrocatalytic CO_{2} reduction is provided as an illustrative example.

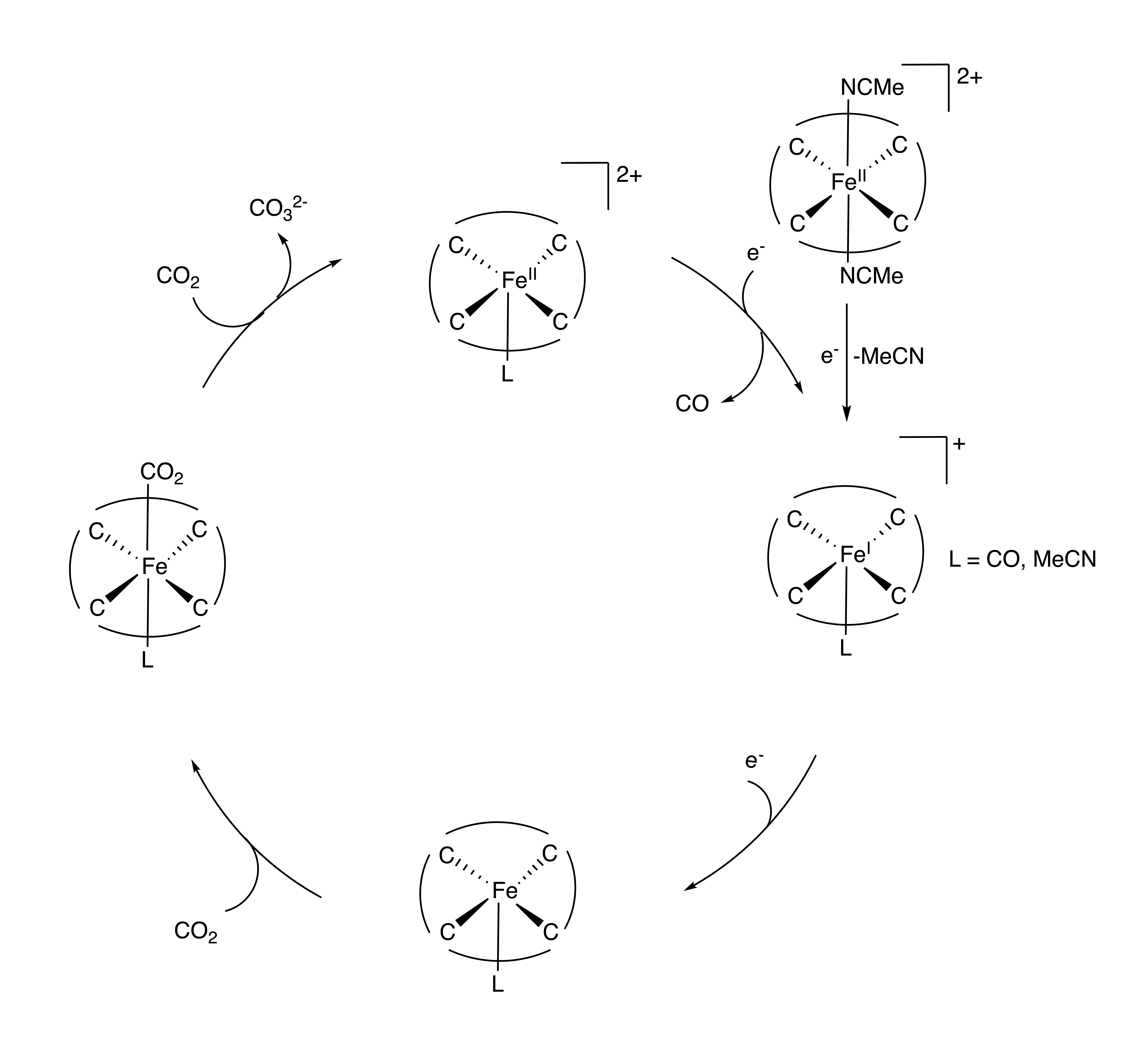
Electrochemical CO_{2} reduction mechanism proposed for a catalytic cycle using a cyclic iron tetracarbene.
