= 2-Imidazoline =

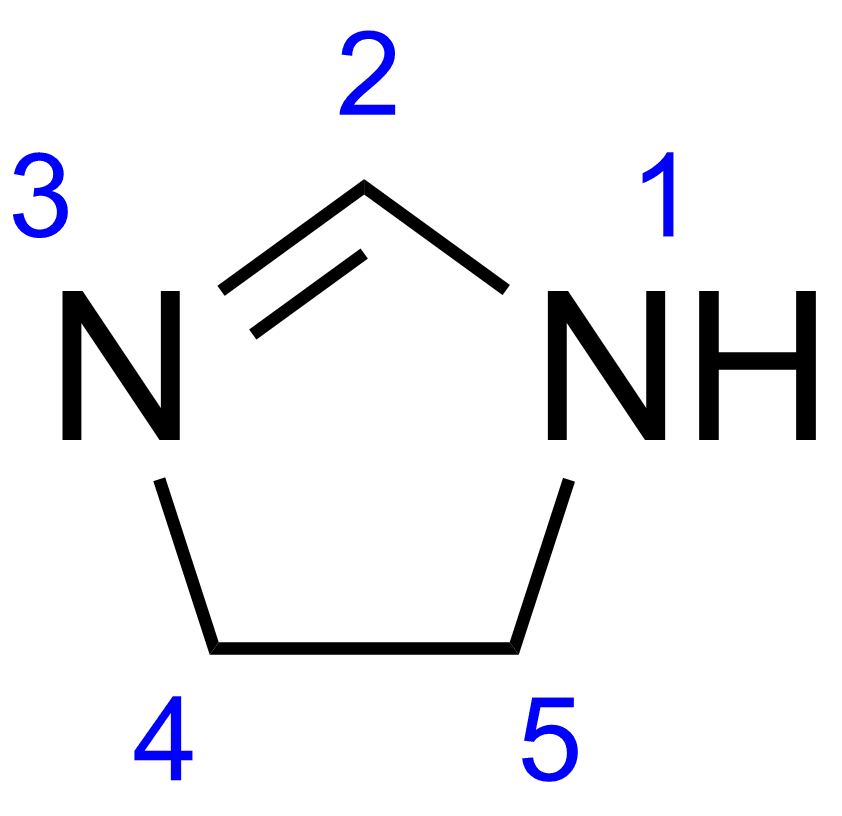

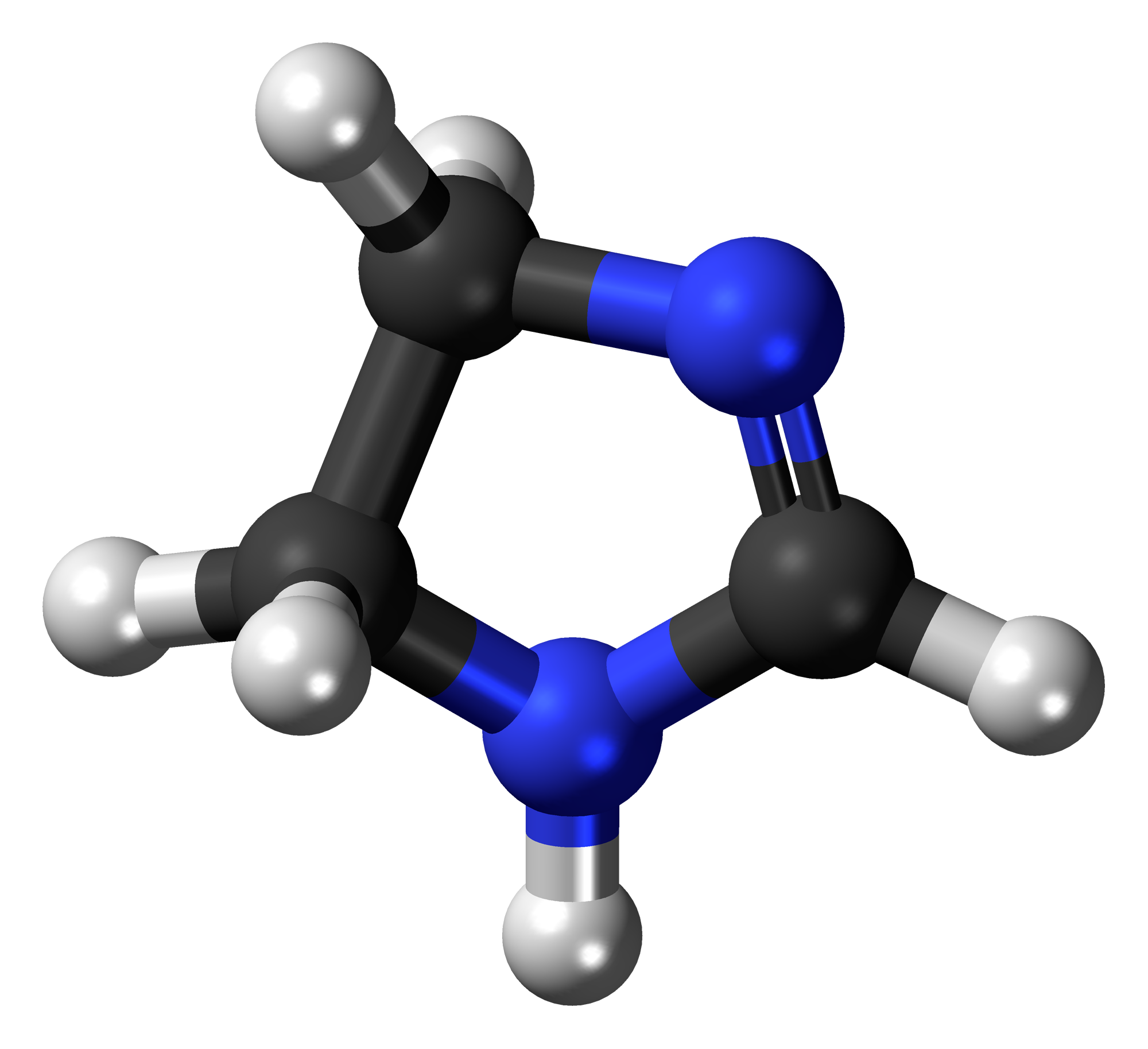

Names
- Preferred IUPAC name 4,5-Dihydro-1H-imidazole
- Other names 2-Imidazoline; 4,5-Dihydro-1,3-diazole

Identifiers
CAS Number	504-75-6
3D model (JSmol)	Interactive image
Beilstein Reference	103920
ChEBI	CHEBI:53094
ChemSpider	61464
ECHA InfoCard	100.007.273
EC Number	207-999-4
Gmelin Reference	2431371
PubChem CID	68156
UNII	D36R5YLK6R
CompTox Dashboard (EPA)	DTXSID2060127
- InChI: InChI=1S/C3H6N2/c1-2-5-3-4-1/h3H,1-2H2,(H,4,5) Key: MTNDZQHUAFNZQY-UHFFFAOYSA-N; InChI=1/C3H6N2/c1-2-5-3-4-1/h3H,1-2H2,(H,4,5) Key: MTNDZQHUAFNZQY-UHFFFAOYAB
- SMILES: N\1=C\NCC/1

Properties
Chemical formula	C_{3}H_{6}N_{2}
Molar mass	70.095 g·mol^{−1}
- Except where otherwise noted, data are given for materials in their standard state (at 25 °C [77 °F], 100 kPa). verify (what is ?) Infobox references

2-Imidazoline (Preferred IUPAC name: 4,5-dihydro-1H-imidazole) is one of three isomers of the nitrogen-containing heterocycle imidazoline, with the formula C_{3}H_{6}N_{2}. The 2-imidazolines are the most common imidazolines commercially, as the ring exists in some natural products and some pharmaceuticals. They also have been examined in the context of organic synthesis, coordination chemistry, and homogeneous catalysis.

== Synthesis ==
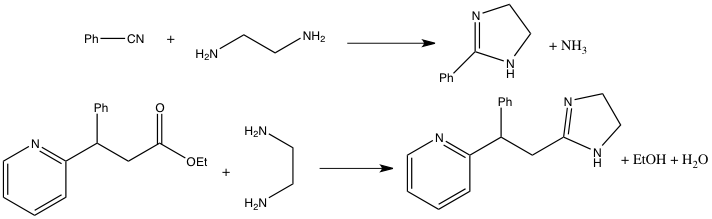
Synthesis of imidazolines from nitrile and from ester precursors.

A variety of routes exist for the synthesis of imidazolines, with the most common methods involving the condensation of 1,2-diamines (e.g. ethylenediamine) with nitriles or esters. The nitrile based route is essentially a cyclic Pinner reaction; it requires high temperatures and acid catalysis and is effective for both alkyl and aryl nitriles.

== As natural products ==
Imidazoline has been found in various natural products. Natural molecules topsentin D and spongotine B were discovered in several marine sponges. These metabolites have received considerable attention because of their potent properties such as antitumor, antiviral, and anti-inflammatory activities.

== Biological role ==
Many imidazolines are biologically active. Most bio-active derivatives bear a substituent (aryl or alkyl group) on the carbon between the nitrogen centers. Some generic names include oxymetazoline, xylometazoline, tetrahydrozoline, and naphazoline.

== Applications ==
=== Pharmaceutical ===
2-imidazolines have been investigated as antihyperglycemic, anti-inflammatory, antihypertensive, antihypercholesterolemic, and antidepressant reagents. The imidazoline-containing drug clonidine is used alone or in combination with other medications to treat high blood pressure. It is also used in the treatment of dysmenorrhea, hypertensive crisis, Tourette's syndrome and attention deficit hyperactivity disorder (ADHD).

2-Imidazolines

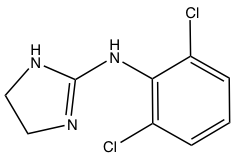
Clonidine

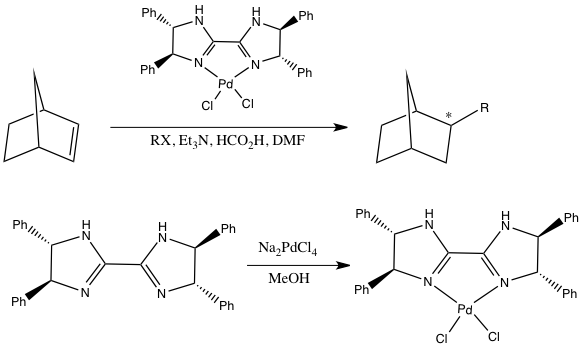
Biimidazoline ligands and a complex.

Second generation Grubbs' catalyst

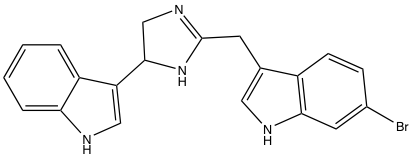
Spongotine B

==== As p53 activators ====
Cis-imidazolines act as small-molecule antagonists of MDM2. These compounds bind MDM2/X in the p53-binding pocket and activate the p53 pathway in cancer cells, leading to cell cycle arrest, apoptosis, and growth inhibition of human tumor xenografts in nude mice. The most active compounds are nutlin-3a and rg-7112, but some other analogs also activate p53.

=== Surfactants ===
Surfactants based around 2-imidazoline, such as sodium lauroamphoacetate, are used in personal care products where mildness and non-irritancy are particularly important (e.g. baby products, "no more tears" shampoos etc.).

=== As precursors of imidazoles ===
Imidazoles can be prepared from dehydrogenation of imidazolines.

=== Homogeneous catalysis ===
As a structural analogue of 2-oxazolines, 2-imidazolines have been developed as ligands in coordination chemistry. The substitutions on the nitrogen atom in the imidazoline ring provide opportunities for fine-tuning the electronic and steric properties. Some of the complexes function as catalysts for Suzuki–Miyaura couplings, Mizoroki–Heck reactions, Diels–Alder reactions, asymmetric allylic substitution, [3,3] sigmatropic rearrangement, Henry reactions.

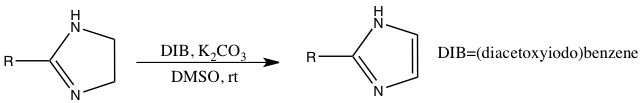

== See also ==
- Imidazoline receptor
- Imidazolidine
