= Michael K. Denk =

German professor

Michael K. Denk (or Karl Michael Denk) is a professor of chemistry at the University of Guelph, Ontario.

Michael Denk obtained his M.Sc. at LMU Munich in Germany (1989) and his Ph.D. at the Technical University of Munich (1992), advised by W. Herrmann, with a dissertation on cyclic metalloamides. He has previously held academic positions at the University of Toronto (1995-2001), Purdue University (1994–1995), and the University of Wisconsin-Madison (1993–1994) and was head of research on Tibetan ethnobotany at Klinge Holding & Research.

Michael Denk's research ranges over several areas of organic and inorganic chemistry, including carbenes and their analogs, carbenium salts, silicon, germanium, and tin chemistry, volatile metal complexes, inorganic photochemistry, ionic liquids, and more; as well as applications such as chemical vapor deposition processes, semiconductors, thin films, etc. He has recently established the reality of the Wanzlick equilibrium, which had been put in doubt by experiments of D. Lemal and others.
