= 2,4,6-Trimethylaniline =

Skeletal formula
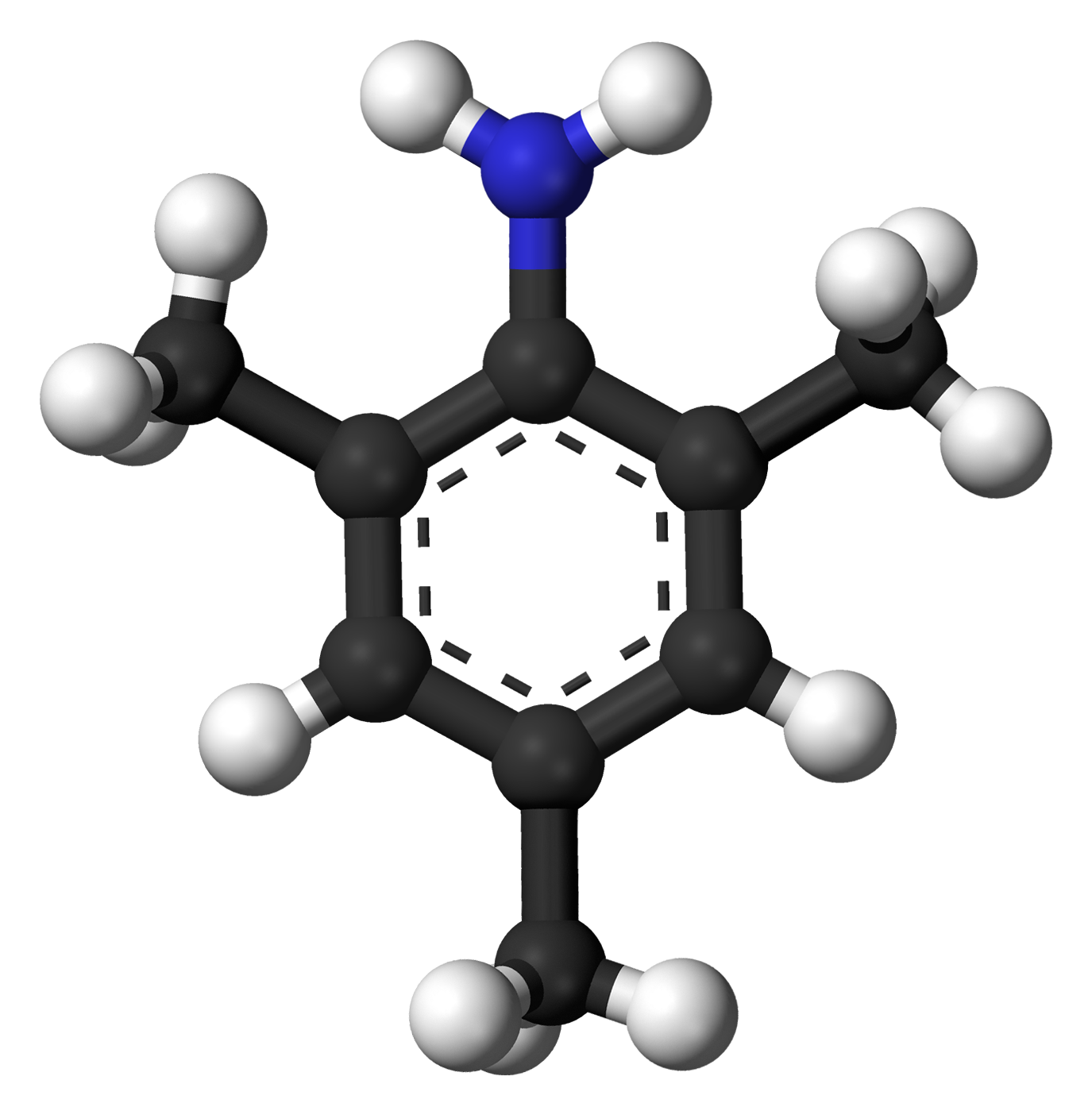
Ball-and-stick model

Names
- Preferred IUPAC name 2,4,6-Trimethylaniline
- Other names Aminomesitylene; 2,4,6-Trimethylbenzenamine; Mesitylamine; Mesidine

Identifiers
CAS Number	88-05-1
3D model (JSmol)	Interactive image
ChEBI	CHEBI:82545
ChemSpider	6647
ECHA InfoCard	100.001.632
EC Number	201-794-3
KEGG	C19540
PubChem CID	6913
UNII	YIR5CRL5BG
UN number	2810 (ANILINE, 2,4,6-TRIMETHYL-)
CompTox Dashboard (EPA)	DTXSID5043847
- InChI: InChI=1S/C9H13N/c1-6-4-7(2)9(10)8(3)5-6/h4-5H,10H2,1-3H3 Key: KWVPRPSXBZNOHS-UHFFFAOYSA-N
- SMILES: CC1=CC(=C(C(=C1)C)N)C

Properties
Chemical formula	C_{9}H_{13}N
Molar mass	135.21 g/mol
Density	0.963 g/mL
Melting point	−4.9 °C (23.2 °F; 268.2 K)
Boiling point	233 °C (451 °F; 506 K)
- Except where otherwise noted, data are given for materials in their standard state (at 25 °C [77 °F], 100 kPa). verify (what is ?) Infobox references

2,4,6-Trimethylaniline is an organic compound with formula (CH_{3})_{3}C_{6}H_{2}NH_{2}. It is an aromatic amine that is of commercial interest as a precursor to dyes. It is prepared by selective nitration of mesitylene, avoiding oxidation of the methyl groups, followed by reduction of the resulting nitro group to the aniline.

== Coordination chemistry ==
Trimethylaniline is a building block to a variety of bulky ligands. Condensation with glyoxal gives the 1,2-diimine ligands. An example is glyoxal-bis(mesitylimine), a yellow solid that is synthesized by condensation of 2,4,6-trimethylaniline and glyoxal. The diimine is a useful precursor to popular NHC ligands including IMes. N-heterocyclic carbenes, as found in 2nd generation Grubbs' catalyst, are also prepared from this compound.

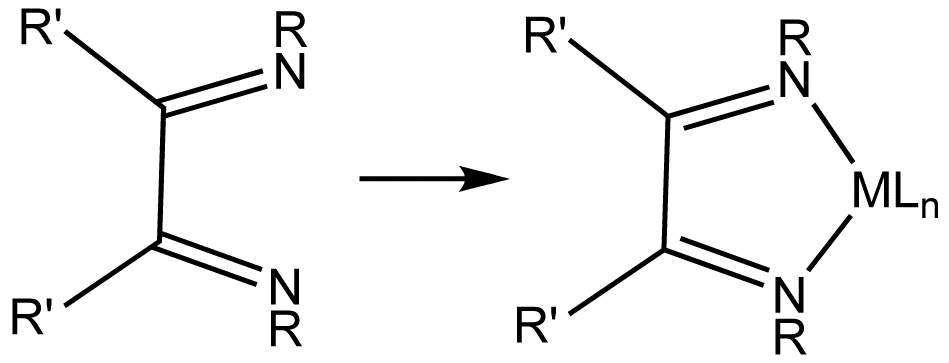
A substituted 1,2-diimine ligand and an idealized metal complex
