= Imidazolidine (data page) =

Chemical data page

The complete data for Imidazolidine
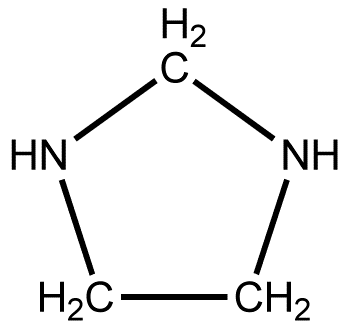
General information
Chemical formula: C_{3}H_{8}N_{2}
Molar mass: 72.1091 g·mol^{−1}
Systematic name:
Imidazolidine ^{a}
Abbreviations: IMD
Synonyms:
CHEBI:33137
Database data
SMILES: C1CNCN1 ^{b}
InChI=1/C3H8N2/c1-2-5-3-4-1/h4-5H,1-3H2 ^{c}

ATC: N/A	CAS: N/A	DrugBank: N/A	EINECS: N/A	PubChem: 449488

Physical properties

Structure	Crystal data	Spectral data: UV-Vis / IR / NMR / MS

Phase behavior	Solid properties	Liquid properties	Gas properties

Hazard properties

MSDS N/A	Main hazards: N/A	NFPA 704	Flash point: N/A	RTECS number: N/A

Chemical properties

XLogP: -0.6 ^{d}	pI:	pK_{a}:	Tautomers:	Hydrogen bond: donor - 2 ^{e}; acceptor - 2 ^{f}

Pharmacological properties

This box:
- Except where noted otherwise, data relate to Standard temperature and pressure.
- Reliability of data general note.
