= Imidazolidine =

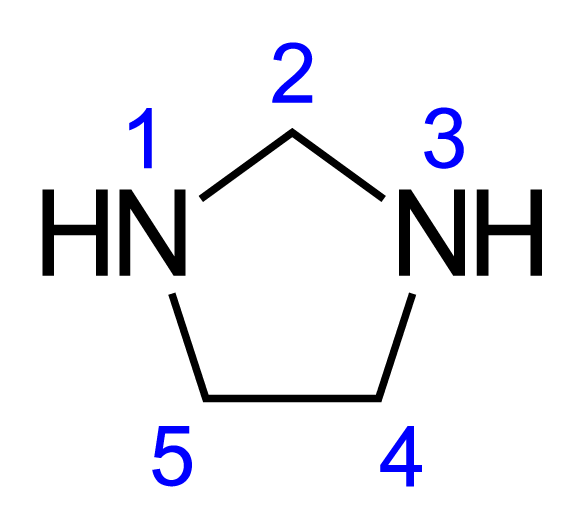

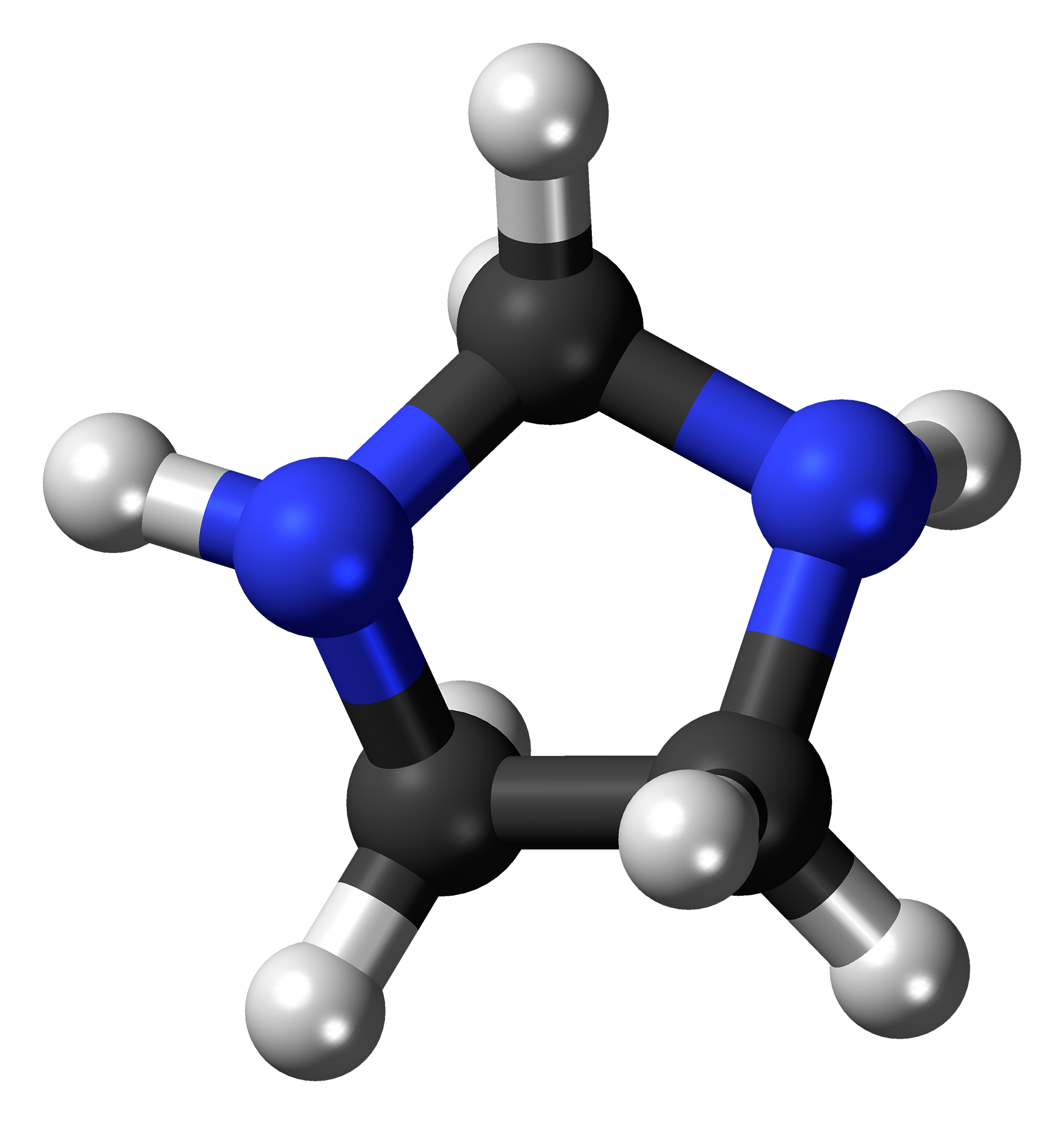

Names
- Preferred IUPAC name Imidazolidine
- Systematic IUPAC name 1,3-Diazacyclopentane
- Other names Tetrahydroimidazole; 1,3-Diazolidine

Identifiers
CAS Number	504-74-5
3D model (JSmol)	Interactive image
Beilstein Reference	102462
ChEBI	CHEBI:33137
ChemSpider	396007
PubChem CID	449488
UNII	AEE9PL2D22
CompTox Dashboard (EPA)	DTXSID2073192
- InChI: InChI=1S/C3H8N2/c1-2-5-3-4-1/h4-5H,1-3H2 Key: WRYCSMQKUKOKBP-UHFFFAOYSA-N; InChI=1/C3H8N2/c1-2-5-3-4-1/h4-5H,1-3H2 Key: WRYCSMQKUKOKBP-UHFFFAOYAC
- SMILES: N1CCNC1

Properties
Chemical formula	C_{3}H_{8}N_{2}
Molar mass	72.109

Supplementary data page
- Imidazolidine (data page)
- Except where otherwise noted, data are given for materials in their standard state (at 25 °C [77 °F], 100 kPa). verify (what is ?) Infobox references

Imidazolidine is a heterocyclic compound (CH_{2})_{2}(NH)_{2}CH_{2}. The parent imidazolidine is lightly studied, but related compounds substituted on one or both nitrogen centers are more common. Generally, they are colorless, polar, basic compounds. Imidazolidines are cyclic 5-membered examples of the general class of aminals.

== Preparation ==
Imidazolidines are traditionally prepared by condensation reaction of 1,2-diamines and aldehydes. Most commonly, one or both nitrogen center is substituted with an alkyl or benzyl (Bn) group:

The first unsubstituted imidazolidine synthesis was reported in 1952.

== Reactions ==
Unsubstituted imidazolidines are often labile. The rings are susceptible to hydrolysis back to the diamine and the aldehyde.

Formally, removal of the two hydrogens at carbon 2 (between the two nitrogens) would yield the carbene dihydroimidazol-2-ylidene. Derivatives of the latter comprise an important class of persistent carbenes.

== Related imidazole-derived heterocycles ==
Classified as a diamine, it is formally derived by the addition of four hydrogen atoms to imidazole. The intermediate, resulting from the addition of only two hydrogen atoms is called imidazoline (dihydroimidazole). The connection of imidazolidine to related compounds is indicated in the Figure.

Structure relationship of imidazole and its reduced derivatives.
