= Dihydroimidazol-2-ylidene =

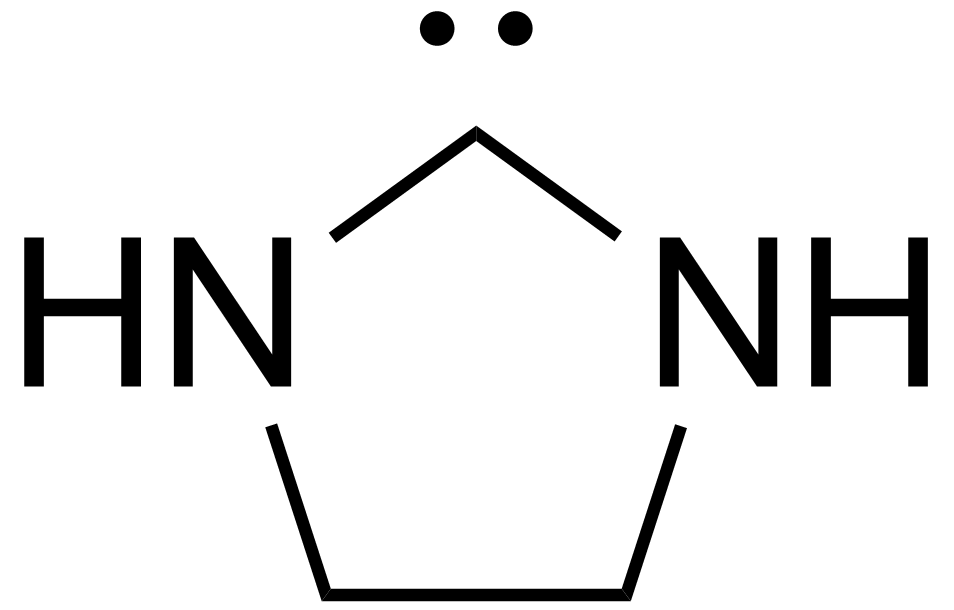
- Skeletal formula of dihydroimidazol-2-ylidene

Names
- Preferred IUPAC name Imidazolidin-2-ylidene
- Other names Diazolanylidene

Identifiers
3D model (JSmol)	Interactive image
ChemSpider	11350507
PubChem CID	60208178
- InChI: InChI=1S/C3H6N2/c1-2-5-3-4-1/h4-5H,1-2H2 Key: JKQUEGZDRZXJNY-UHFFFAOYSA-N; InChI=1/C3H6N2/c1-2-5-3-4-1/h4-5H,1-2H2 Key: JKQUEGZDRZXJNY-UHFFFAOYAT
- SMILES: [C]1NCCN1

Properties
Chemical formula	C_{3}H_{6}N_{2}
Molar mass	70.095 g·mol^{−1}
- Except where otherwise noted, data are given for materials in their standard state (at 25 °C [77 °F], 100 kPa). verify (what is ?) Infobox references

Dihydroimidazol-2-ylidene is a hypothetical organic compound with formula C_{3}H_{6}N_{2}. It would be a heterocyclic compound, formally derived from imidazolidine with two hydrogen atoms removed from carbon number 2, leaving two vacant chemical bonds — which makes it a carbene.

Although carbenes in general are extremely short-lived, some derivatives of this compound are surprisingly stable, and form an important class of the persistent carbenes. They include the first stable carbenes postulated (but not isolated) by Hans-Werner Wanzlick around 1960.

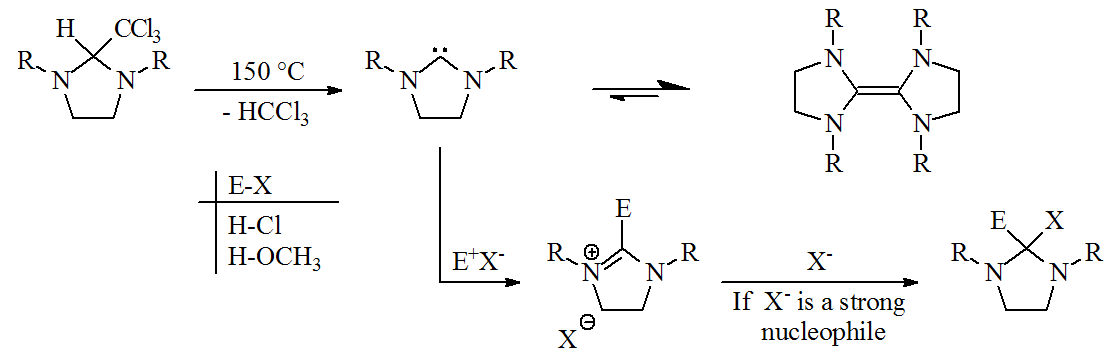
Wanzlick's mechanism for the reaction of dihydroimidazol-2-ylidene with electrophiles

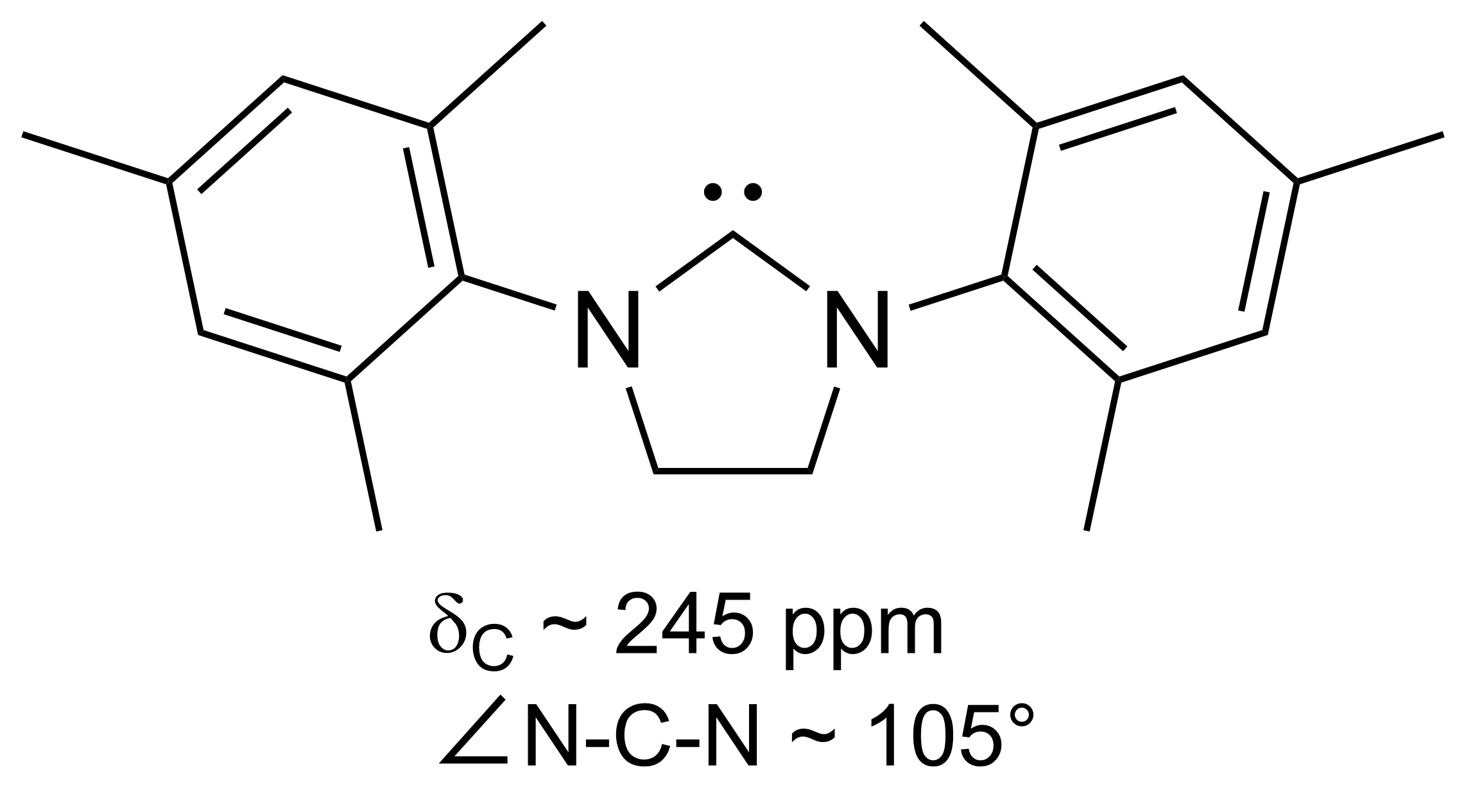
1,3-Dimesityl-imidazol-4,5-dihydro-2-ylidene, a stable carbene without delocalization around the ring containing the carbenic carbon (external viewer)

They also include an example of the (saturated) imidazolin-2-ylidene (carbene) reported by A.J. Arduengo in 1995.
