= Diimine =

Diimines are organic compounds containing two imine (RCH=NR') groups. Common derivatives are 1,2-diimines and 1,3-diimines. These compounds are used as ligands, but they are also precursors to other organic compounds.

== Preparation ==
Diimines are prepared by condensation reactions where a dialdehyde or diketone is treated with amine and water is eliminated. Many are derived from the condensation of 1,2-diketones and dialdehydes with amines, often anilines. The dialdehyde glyoxal is an especially common precursor. Similar methods are used to prepare Schiff bases and oximes.

== 1,2-Diimines ==
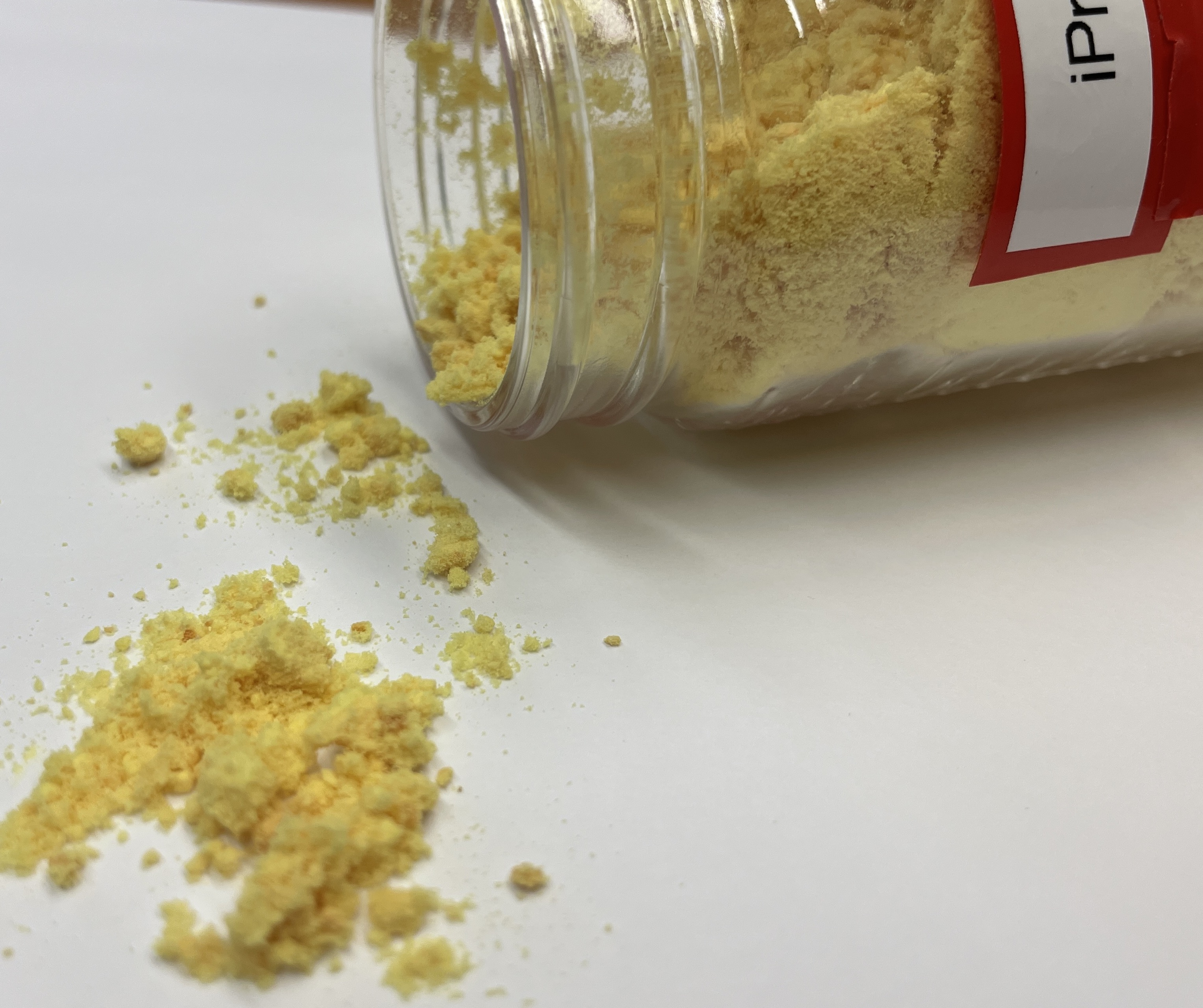
Sample of alpha-diimine derived from 2,6-diisopropylaniline and glyoxal.

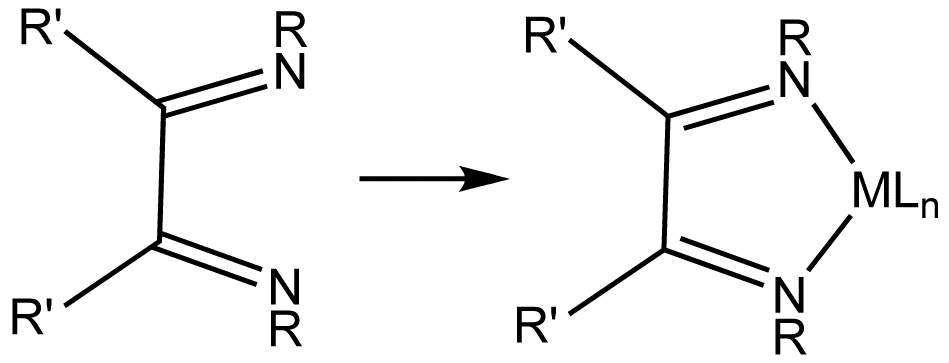
A substituted 1,2-diimine ligand and an idealized metal complex.

The 1,2-diimines are also called α-diimines and 1,4-diazabutadienes. An example is glyoxal-bis(mesitylimine), a yellow solid that is synthesized by condensation of 2,4,6-trimethylaniline and glyoxal. 2,2'-Bipyridine is a 1,2-diimine.

1,2-Diketimines are “non-innocent ligands”, akin to the dithiolenes.

Synthesis of [tBuN-CH=CH-tBuN]Si.

Synthesis of diiminopyridine complexes.

== 1,3-Diimines ==
For example, acetylacetone (2,4-pentanedione) and a primary alkyl- or arylamine will react, typically in acidified ethanol, to form a diketimine. 1,3-Diketimines are often referred to as HNacNac, a modification of the abbreviation Hacac for the conjugate acid of acetylacetone. These species form bidentate anionic ligands.

== Uses ==
Substituted α-diimine ligands are useful in the preparation of post-metallocene catalysts, which are used for the polymerization of alkenes.

1,2-Diimines are precursors to NHC ligands by condensation with formaldehyde.

Reduction of 1,2-diimines gives diamines.

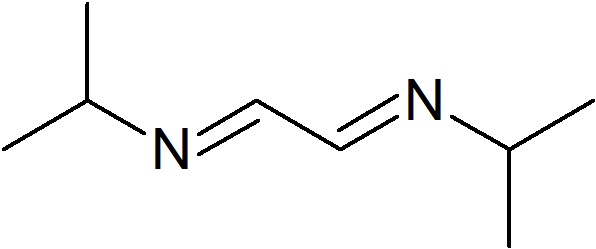
N,N'-di(propan-2-yl)ethane-1,2-diimine

N,N'-di(propan-2-yl)ethane-1,2-diimine is a riot control agent that is synthesized by the condensation of glyoxal with isopropyl amine. Inhalation of 5mg can lead to irritation and congestion.
