= Tetraaminoethylene =

Hypothetical organic molecule ((H2N)2C=C(NH2)2)

Names
- Systematic IUPAC name Ethene-1,1,2,2-tetramine
- Other names Ethylenetetramine

Identifiers
CAS Number	4363-45-5
3D model (JSmol)	Interactive image
ChemSpider	11487764
PubChem CID	17899866
CompTox Dashboard (EPA)	DTXSID40591528
- InChI: InChI=1S/C2H8N4/c3-1(4)2(5)6/h3-6H2 Key: XXWSZMQKQLNDLC-UHFFFAOYSA-N
- SMILES: NC(N)=C(N)N

Properties
Chemical formula	C_{2}H_{8}N_{4}
Molar mass	88.114 g·mol^{−1}
- Except where otherwise noted, data are given for materials in their standard state (at 25 °C [77 °F], 100 kPa). verify (what is ?) Infobox references

In organic chemistry, tetraaminoethylene is a hypothetical, organic compound with formula C_{2}N_{4}H_{8} or (H_{2}N)_{2}C=C(NH_{2})_{2}. Like all polyamines that are geminal, this compound has never been synthesised and is believed to be extremely unstable.

However, there are many stable compounds that can be viewed as derivatives of tetraaminoethylene, with various organic functional groups substituted for some or all hydrogen atoms. These compounds, which have the general formula (R_{2}N)_{2}C=C(NR_{2})_{2}, are collectively called tetraaminoethylenes.

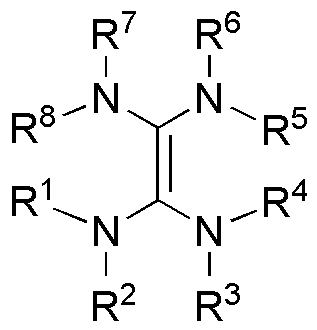
General chemical structure of tetraaminoethylene derivatives

Tetraaminoethylenes are important in organic chemistry as dimers of diaminocarbenes, a type of stable carbene with the general formula (R_{2}N)_{2}C:.

== Reactions ==
- Tetraaminoethylenes react with acids to give formamidinium salts.
