= Anthony J. Arduengo =

American chemist

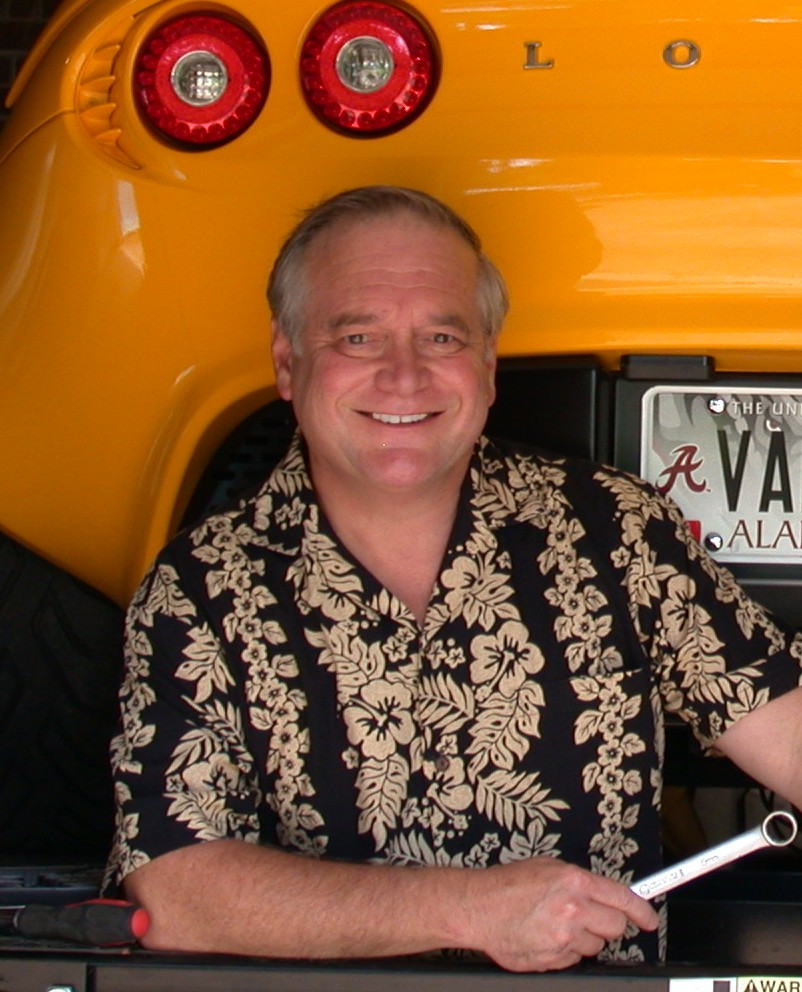
- Born: Anthony Joseph Arduengo III; 1952 (age 73–74); Tampa, Florida, U.S.
- Education: Georgia Institute of Technology
- Known for: Unusual Valency, Carbene Chemistry
- Awards: Alexander von Humboldt Prize; Fellow - American Association for the Advancement of Science; ICMGC Gold Medal for Excellence in Main-Group Element Chemistry
- Scientific career
- Fields: Inorganic chemistry, Organic chemistry, Unusual Valency
- Workplaces: Georgia Institute of Technology; University of Alabama; Technische Universität - Braunschweig; DuPont Central Research; University of Illinois
- Doctoral advisor: E.M. Burgess

Anthony Joseph Arduengo III is Professor of the Practice at the Georgia Institute of Technology, Saxon Professor Emeritus of Chemistry at the University of Alabama, adjunct professor at the Institute for Inorganic Chemistry of Braunschweig University of Technology in Germany, and co-founder of the StanCE coalition for sustainable chemistry based on woody biomass (Xylochemistry). He is notable for his work on chemical compounds with unusual valency, especially in the field of stable carbene research.

== Early life ==
Anthony "Bo" Arduengo was born in 1952 in Tampa, Florida. He grew up in the Atlanta, Georgia area. His father was a pressman and mechanic with the Atlanta Journal-Constitution and instilled his son with an interest and skill for all things mechanical and scientific. By the age of 16, he and his father had built his first car from miscellaneous parts. The car was registered as street-legal and road-worthy. With some re-engineering, the car was later fitted to run on alternate fuels including alcohol and hydrogen (which would foretell Arduengo's professional research involvement with President Bush's 2003 National Hydrogen Fuel Initiative (HFI) and United States Department of Energy's Chemical Hydrogen Storage Program by more than 30 years).

== Education ==
Arduengo attended Bouldercrest and Meadowview Elementary Schools, and Walker High School. In 1969 he left high school with enrollment in Georgia Tech's Joint Enrollment Program for High School Students (JEPHS). He obtained his BSc (1974, cum laude) and his PhD (1976) at Georgia Tech, advised by Edward M. Burgess. That made him an academic descendant of Justus von Liebig. As an undergraduate at Georgia Tech, Arduengo's research activities began in the laboratory of Professor Charles L. Liotta. He was awarded NSF undergraduate fellowships in 1972 & 1973 when he had moved to research in the Burgess group.

As an undergraduate, Arduengo was a member of the Georgia Tech Band and served as Executive Officer and Captain for that organization. In 1971 he was inducted into the Iota chapter of Kappa Kappa Psi. In 1972 he was tapped by the Alpha Eta Circle of Omicron Delta Kappa; later serving as Secretary and President for the local Circle.

== Career ==
Arduengo was a research scientist at DuPont from 1976 to 1977, and from 1984 to 1998, and assistant professor at the University of Illinois from 1977 to 1984. He retired from teaching in 2018 and is now Professor of the Practice in the School of Chemistry and Biochemistry at the Georgia Institute of Technology, Saxon Chair Emeritus of Chemistry at the University of Alabama, and holds a position as adjunct professor at the Technische Universität in Braunschweig, Germany.

In DuPont's Central Research and Development Department, Arduengo began his career in the Chemical Sciences Section (1977 & on return in 1984). In 1988, he was appointed Research Leader. A move into the Polymer Science section of CR&D in 1991 was accompanied by promotion to Group Leader. His final position with DuPont was as Research Fellow which he attained in 1995. The award of an Alexander von Humboldt Senior Research Prize in 1996 began Arduengo's transition back into academe. The one year Humboldt award was spent in Braunschweig, Germany at the Technical University. On return to DuPont, Arduengo maintained a guest Professor appointment in Braunschweig, and in 1999 also made the transition to academe in the U.S. with his assumption of the Saxon Chair in Chemistry at The University of Alabama in Tuscaloosa.

== Research ==
=== Graduate research at Georgia Tech ===
Arduengo's research interests focus largely on the chemistry of new or unusual bonding arrangements, and unusual valency. As a graduate student in the Burgess group, his research involved organo-main group element chemistry, specifically, thiocarbonyl ylides, and low-coordinate hypervalent sulfur compounds.

Thiocarbonyl ylide from Arduengo's Ph.D. dissertation. external viewer.

Hypervalent sulfuranide from Arduengo's Ph.D. dissertation. external viewer.

=== DuPont 1977 ===
In 1977 when he joined E. I. du Pont de Nemours and Company, Arduengo became a member of the exploratory chemistry group of Howard Simmons in CR&D. His first research project involved trimethylsilyl esters of inorganic acids as reagents for organic synthesis.

=== University of Illinois 1978–1984 ===
At Illinois Arduengo examined more broadly the areas of organo-main group element chemistry, and molecules containing unusual valency. His first publications involving the chemistry of electron-deficient carbenes occurred during this period. This work with electron deficient carbenes led to the first structure determinations on a nitrile ylide and a carbonyl ylide. His later work with carbene chemistry would become his most recognized contribution to the field of chemistry (vide infra). During the Illinois years Arduengo had a close collaboration with his colleague J.C. Martin who was a physical-organic chemist also working on organo-main group element chemistry and hypervalency. Many of the technical discussions between Martin and Arduengo would take place over lunch (the choice of restaurants often influenced by the quality of the napkins for writing chemical structures). To facilitate discussions about unusual molecular structures and bonding for main-group element centers, Martin and Arduengo devised the N-X-L nomenclature system. The synthesis and characterization of the first compound with a planar T-shaped, 10-electron 3-coordinate bonding arrangement at a phosphorus atom, ADPO, was also accomplished by the Arduengo group at Illinois and paved the way for a range of novel main-group element chemistry (including the discovery of edge inversion) on his return to DuPont. The final Illinois research extended the newly discovered ADPO chemistry to the arsenic analog (ADAsO).

Diazotetrakis(trifluoro methyl)cyclopentadiene from Arduengo and Janulis. external viewer.

Nitrilium ylide from Arduengo and Janulis. external viewer.

Carbonyl ylide from Arduengo and Janulis. external viewer.

The original 10-P-3 ADPO from Arduengo and Culley. external viewer.

ADAsO from Arduengo and Culley. external viewer.

=== DuPont 1984–1999 ===
On returning to DuPont in 1984, Arduengo resumed a position in CR&D and continued the research into the recently discovered ADPO molecule and related structures. This line of research proved to be extremely fruitful and resulted in a steady string of publications on new and unusual bonding arrangements. The ADPO related chemistry provided a basis for the discovery of a new inversion process, edge inversion, which was fully characterized and modelled by the collaborative work of Arduengo and David A. Dixon at DuPont. Additionally, the DuPont team provided experimental verification on the new inversion pathway at 3-coordinate phosphorus centers and a 4-coordinate germanium molecule.

Arduengo's work with DuPont also involved a number of applied projects including the flexible polyimide film, Kapton-ZT, that is widely used in electronics for flexible printed circuits, connections, and insulation. Arduengo's research at DuPont often coalesced with his other hobbies outside the laboratory; for example with sports cars (cf. photo in the summary box above). He contributed to development of low VOC automotive coatings by devising catalysts for a novel cross-linking chemistry used by DuPont Performance Coatings in next-generation low-VOC paints. Eventually, DuPont waterborne performance coatings would be used by Lotus on their Elise and Exige models. Arduengo's effort on the industrial-scale syntheses of the catalysts for the paints on which he worked would launch his re-entry into the area of carbene chemistry, but this time it was to be nucleophilic rather than electrophilic carbenes. The observation that the catalyst syntheses were well tolerant of varied reaction conditions and substituents led Arduengo to postulate that the imidazol-2-ylidenes that were intermediates in the syntheses had to be far more stable than the then conventional wisdom would allow.

As Arduengo's involvement in the automotive coatings program came to an end, he submitted a proposal to the management in CR&D to isolate these apparently stable carbenes and study their chemistry. The proposal was soundly declined with the admonition that he should have certainly known better than to make such a suggestion in light of the long history of carbene chemistry that firmly established them as reactive intermediates that could not be isolated as stable entities. However, Arduengo (already well-aware of the history) had the starting materials on hand for the chemistry and decided to proceed with the experiments. "Arduengo's gamble paid off. In 1991, more than 150 years after the first attempt ..." a stable crystalline carbene was isolated and characterized in laboratories at DuPont. After the first successful reaction to produce a stable carbene, Arduengo won the support of DuPont management and research in this area continued. Carbenes bearing a variety of substituent groups were prepared and characterized. The saturated imidazolin-2-ylidenes that were extensively investigated by Hans-Werner Wanzlick thirty years earlier (without isolation) were now also shown to be stable enough to isolate with appropriate substituents at nitrogen. An air-stable carbene was produced. The chemistry was extended to include thiazol-2-ylidenes (conjectured to exist in 1957 as a reactive intermediate in the vitamin B_{1} catalytic cycle, but not isolated for 40 years). The imidazol-2-ylidenes were extensively characterized by their NMR properties, photo-electron spectroscopy, and exact experimental electron density mapping by X-ray and neutron diffraction techniques.

The Arduengo group's characterization of stable carbenes was complemented by a wide-ranging exploration of their chemistry. This new chemistry included carbene reactions with numerous element centers including iodine, aluminum, copper, silver, magnesium, zinc, germanium, nickel, platinum, lanthanides, and hydrogen in the form a bis(carbene)-proton complex. Arduengo's research from 1996 also reflects his interaction with his host for his Alexander von Humboldt Research Prize, Professor Reinhard Schmutzler. His carbene chemistry conducted from Braunschweig included reactivity studies of imidazol-2-ylidenes with fluorinated inorganic compounds. New structures included carbene•phenyltetrafluorophosphorane, carbene•PF_{5}, carbene•AsF_{5}, carbene•SbF_{5}, and carbene•BF_{3} adducts. Arduengo's final work on carbenes at DuPont included synthesis and characterization of carbene·alkaline earth metal, carbene•antimony, carbene•cadmium, and carbene•lithium adducts. Reactions of carbenes with phosphinidenes were also reported from Arduengo's laboratory in addition to insertion reactions of imidazolin-2-ylidenes.

In 1998, Arduengo and coworkers carefully re-examined the earlier attempts to produce stable carbenes in Wanzlick's laboratory in light of the knowledge and experience gained from the recent successful experiments at DuPont. Although the majority of Wanzlick's work on the saturated imidazolin-2-ylidenes would have been expected to yield dimers in the absence of bulky substituents on nitrogen, a single (unsaturated) imidazol-2-ylidene, 1,3,4,5-tetraphenylimidazol-2-ylidene, remained as an example of a carbene that could (should) have been isolable. The re-examination of Wanzlick's original procedure identified some key experimental features that would have hindered the original researchers. With these problems corrected, the DuPont scientists were able to isolate the target carbene and fully characterize it including an X-ray structure determination. In a tribute to Hans-Werner Wanzlick, these results were published under the title "1,3,4,5-Tetraphenylimidazol-2-ylidene: The Realization of Wanzlick's Dream."

Antimony analog of ADPO (ADSbO) synthesized at DuPont by Arduengo and Stewart. external viewer.

Nine coordinate bismuth complex prepared by Arduengo and Stewart. external viewer.

Saturated ADPO analog used by Arduengo, Dixon, and Roe to verify Edge Inversion at 3-coordinate phosphorus.

Germanium compound used by Arduengo, Dixon, and Roe to verify Edge Inversion at 4-coordinate centers. external viewer.

First stable crystalline carbene prepared at DuPont. external viewer.

First fully characterized imidazolin-2-ylidene (saturated) carbene isolated at DuPont. external viewer.

Stable thiazol-2-ylidene (vitamin B_{1} analog). external viewer.

Air-stable carbene. external viewer

Stable small perdeuterocarbene used for exact electron density mapping experiments. external viewer.

Wanzlick's original tetraphenylimidazol-2-ylidene isolated and characterized at DuPont. external viewer.

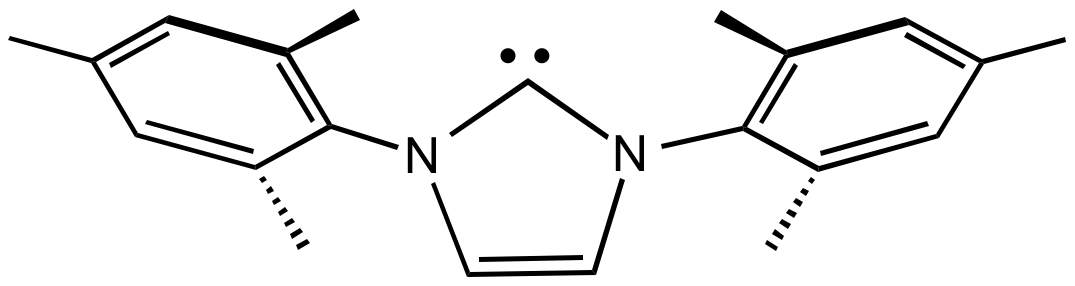
IMes, a popular NHC ligand.

=== University of Alabama 1999–2020 ===
At the University of Alabama research from Arduengo's laboratory has focused on enhancements to the basic structure of the imidazol-2-ylidenes through substituent effects leading to novel compounds like a cyclopentadienyl fused imidazol-2-ylidene. Research into the unusual valency in diphosphacyclobutane-2,4-diyls has been reported from the Arduengo group in collaboration with Professors Masaaki Yoshifuji and Shigekazu Ito. Arduengo also directs research programs into Chemical Hydrogen Storage and nonlinear optical materials. In 2015, together with Professor Till Opatz (Johannes Gutenberg Universität-Mainz) Arduengo founded the StanCE coalition for sustainable chemistry based on woody biomass (Xylochemistry).

=== Georgia Tech 2020–present ===
In June 2020 Arduengo returned to his alma mater as Professor of the Practice. His research in carbene chemistry continues there along efforts in support of the Medicines for All Institute sustainable chemistry, and a partnership to address repatriation of critical chemical manufacturing technology to U.S. shores.

== Awards ==
- National Academy of Inventors, elected Member, October 2013.
- Charles M. Knight Lectureship, University of Akron, April 2013.
- Fellow of the American Association for the Advancement of Science, October 2007
- Walter J. Chute Lectureship 1999–2000.
- Gold Medal for "Excellence in Main Group Chemistry Research" from The International Council on Main Group Chemistry, 1996
- Alexander von Humboldt Senior Research Prize, 1996
- NSF Undergraduate Fellowship, 1972, 1973
