= Hans-Werner Wanzlick =

German chemist (1917–1988)

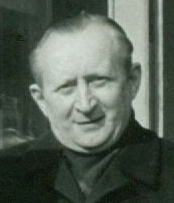
- Hans-Werner Wanzlick (1982)
- Born: October 5, 1917; Berlin
- Died: November 1988 (aged 71)
- Education: Technische Universität Berlin
- Known for: Carbene Chemistry
- Scientific career
- Fields: Organic chemistry, Carbene Chemistry
- Workplaces: Technische Universität Berlin
- Doctoral advisor: Helmuth Scheibler

Hans-Werner Wanzlick (1917-1988) was a German chemist. A Professor of chemistry at Technische Universität Berlin he is notable for work on persistent carbenes and for proposing the Wanzlick equilibrium between saturated imidazolin-2-ylidenes and their dimers — which he called "das doppelte Lottchen", after a 1949 novel by Erich Kästner about a pair of mischievous twins.
