= SIMes =

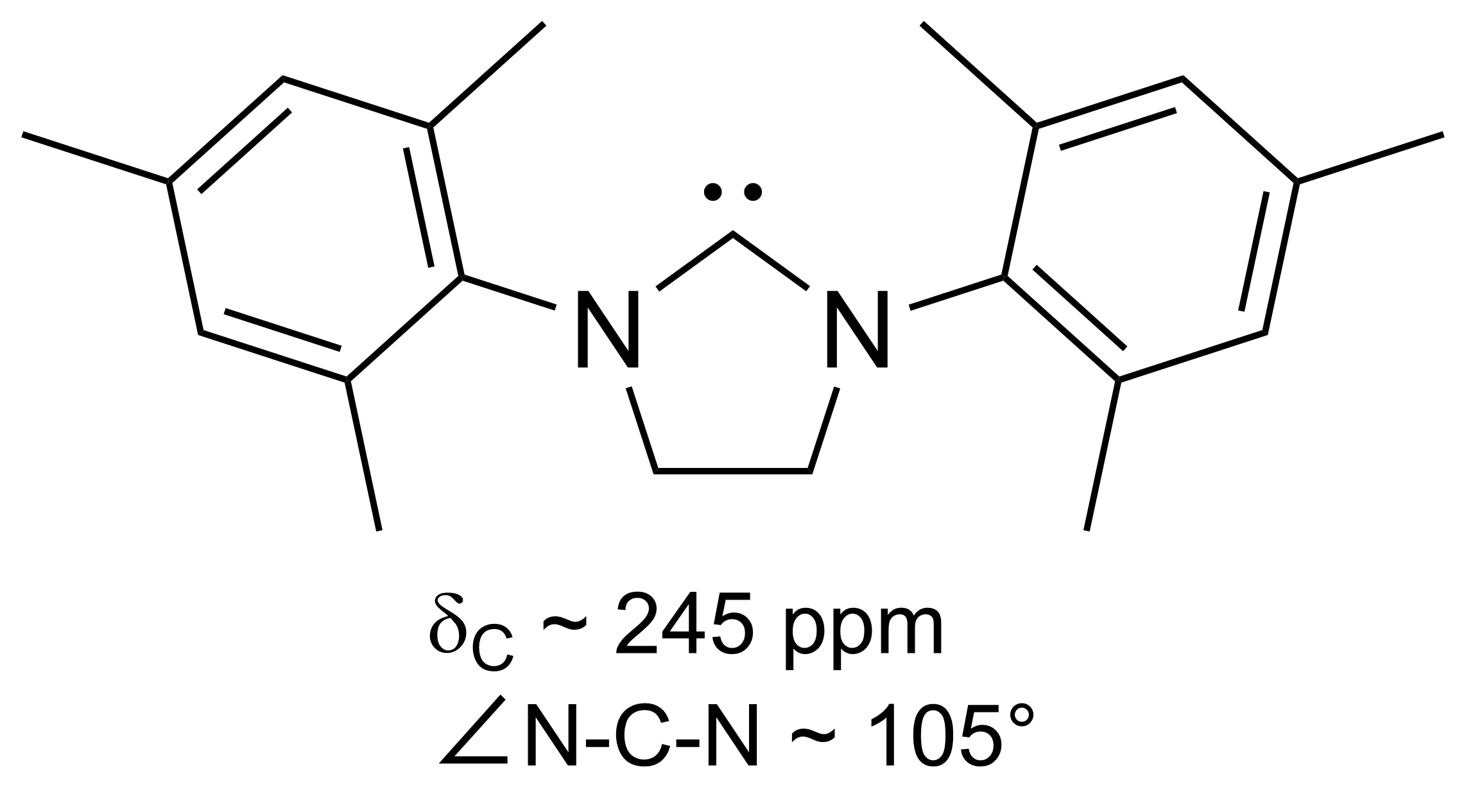

Names
- IUPAC name 1,3-Bis(2,4,6-trimethylphenyl)-4,5-dihydroimidazol-2-ylidene
- Other names IMesH_{2}, H_{2}IMes, 1,3-Dimesityl-imidazol-4,5-dihydro-2-ylidene

Identifiers
CAS Number	173035-11-5
3D model (JSmol)	Interactive image
ChemSpider	9403305
PubChem CID	11228257
CompTox Dashboard (EPA)	DTXSID20459319
- InChI: InChI=1S/C21H26N2/c1-14-9-16(3)20(17(4)10-14)22-7-8-23(13-22)21-18(5)11-15(2)12-19(21)6/h9-12H,7-8H2,1-6H3 Key: LSMWOQFDLBIYPM-UHFFFAOYSA-N
- SMILES: Cc1cc(C)c(c(C)c1)N2CCN([C]2)c3c(C)cc(C)cc3C

Properties
Chemical formula	C_{21}H_{26}N_{2}
Molar mass	306.453 g·mol^{−1}
Melting point	79 to 85 °C (174 to 185 °F; 352 to 358 K)
- Except where otherwise noted, data are given for materials in their standard state (at 25 °C [77 °F], 100 kPa). Infobox references

SIMes (or H_{2}Imes) is an N-heterocyclic carbene. It is a white solid that dissolves in organic solvents. The compound is used as a ligand in organometallic chemistry. It is structurally related to the more common ligand IMes but with a saturated backbone (the S of SIMes indicates a saturated backbone). It is slightly more flexible and is a component in Grubbs II. It is prepared by alkylation of trimethylaniline by dibromoethane followed by ring closure and dehydrohalogenation.
