= Imidazoline =

Class of heterocycles

Structures of 2-, 3-, and 4-imidazolines.

Imidazoline is a heterocycle formally derived from imidazole by the reduction of one of the two double bonds. Three isomers are known, 2-imidazolines, 3-imidazolines, and 4-imidazolines. The 2- and 3-imidazolines contain an imine center, whereas the 4-imidazolines contain an alkene group. The 2-imidazoline group occurs in several drugs.

Chemical relationship of imidazole to its reduced derivatives.

== See also ==
- Imidazoline receptor
