= Carbodicarbenes =

Class of carbon compounds

Representative example of carbodicarbene (CDC) stabilized by NHCs

Carbodicarbenes (CDCs) are a subclass of carbon(0) compounds known as carbones consisting of a divalent central carbon atom stabilized by two neutral carbene donors, most commonly N-heterocyclic carbenes (NHCs) or cyclic (alkyl)(amino)carbenes (CAACs). As such, they may be thought of as highly nucleophilic carbon centers situated between two singlet carbenes. The reactivity of CDCs is distinct from that of traditional carbenes: whereas carbenes possess one lone pair and an empty p orbital that allows for back-bonding, CDCs feature two lone pairs, leading to enhanced Lewis basicity and donor strength. This combination of unusual electronic structure with a formally carbon(0) center allows for applications in small-molecule activation, organometallic catalysis, and the stabilization of unusual oxidation states in main group element complexes.

== Historical Background ==
=== Carbodicarbene Precursors ===
Hexaphenylcarbodiphosphorane and its resonance structures

The conceptual foundation for CDCs lies in the study of carbones, a class of carbon(0) compounds in which a central carbon atom is stabilized by two strong σ-donor ligands. In 1961, Ramirez and co-workers synthesized the first carbone, hexaphenylcarbodiphosphorane, which consisted of a zero-oxidation state carbon stabilized by two triphenylphosphine donors and served as the first synthesized example of the carbodiphosphorane (CDP) subclass. The crystal structure would be solved by Wheatley and co-workers in 1972, before Kaska and colleagues proposed that the bonds between the phosphorus and central carbon were dative, giving rise to a zerovalent carbon. It was not until 2006 when computational chemist Gernot Frenking proposed that the central carbon of CDPs had two electron lone pairs.

=== Theoretical Prediction and Experimental Validation ===
CDPs were the only known class of isolable carbones before advances in computational chemistry allowed researchers to explore the possibility of stabilizing carbon(0) centers with non-phosphine ligands. In 2007, Frenking and Tonner performed DFT studies predicting that two singlet carbenes could replace the stabilization offered by phosphines.

With the theoretical groundwork in place, the Bertrand group in 2007 reported the first synthesis of an isolable bis(carbene)-stabilized carbon(0) compound stable under ambient conditions and interrogable by standard characterization, providing experimental validation that neutral carbenes (in this case, NHCs) could stabilize a carbon(0) center. Additional support for the existence of CDCs was provided when Fürstner and co-workers isolated of a gold(I) complex of tetra(dimethylamino)allene whose structure corroborated the theoretical predictions of CDCs' electronic configuration and structure.

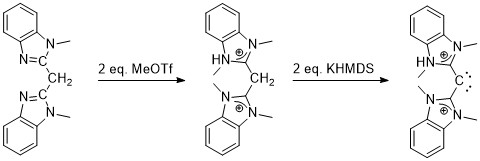
Synthesis of first CDC with known singlet carbenes flanking

Subsequent studies quickly expanded this chemistry to include CAAC-stabilized and mixed-carbene system CDCs with tunable steric and electronic properties, making CDCs a unique class of compounds with broad applications in main group and organometallic chemistry.

== Structure and Bonding ==
=== Electronic Configuration ===
Carbene vs Carbone

The defining feature of CDCs is the presence of a central carbon(0) atom stabilized by two neutral carbene donors. In contrast to carbenes, which contain one lone pair and one vacant p orbital, the carbon atom in a CDC supports two orthogonal lone pairs. This electronic configuration is characteristic of the carbone family and was first exemplified by CDPs. In CDCs, however, the stabilizing ligands are strong σ-donor carbenes – most commonly N-heterocyclic carbenes (NHCs), cyclic (alkyl)(amino)carbenes (CAACs), or related singlet carbenes – rather than phosphines, and, through their pi-accepting abilities, allow for the isolation of otherwise unstable carbon(0) species.

The bonding in CDCs is best described through invoking dative bonds, in which each carbene ligand donates a filled orbital into an empty orbital on the central carbon. Receiving two σ-donor interactions, the carbon center formally maintains an oxidation state of zero and retains two lone pairs. Computational studies, particularly those by Frenking and co-workers, show that the HOMO of a carbodicarbene would be the σ-type lone pair on the carbon(0) center, while the HOMO–1 corresponds to the orthogonal π-type lone pair. These orbitals are localized primarily on the central carbon, accounting for the exceptional nucleophilicity and donor strength of CDCs. The former lone pair allows for σ-donation while the latter allows for π-donation, a fundamental difference from carbenes which serve as σ-donors and π-acceptors via the empty p orbital. Together, these orbitals give the central carbon a highly electron-rich character and explain its Lewis basic behavior.

=== Geometric Structure ===
The first crystallographically characterized CDC was reported in 2008 by Bertrand, providing direct evidence for the highly bent allene geometry predicted for carbon(0) species. The solid-state structure revealed a bent C=C=C framework with an angle of 134.8°, in contrast to the near-linear geometry of ordinary allenes. The terminal C=C distances (~1.34 Å) retain partial double-bond character, while the C–N bond (~1.40 Å) length of the stabilizing NHCs indicate significant π acceptance towards the carbene ligands. The carbon center adopts a nearly planar coordination environment consistent with two orthogonal lone pairs. These crystallographic features provided the first definitive experimental confirmation that CDCs contain a divalent carbon(0) atom stabilized by two neutral carbene donors, and they remain the structural benchmark for identifying CDCs in subsequent studies.

The geometry of the CDC framework can be tuned through the steric and electronic properties of the carbene ligands, with CAAC-stabilized CDCs often displaying slightly more pronounced bending due to their greater π-acidity.

== Synthesis ==
The synthesis of CDCs has evolved over the last several decades. Strategies have evolved from deprotonation of highly substituted allyl cations to the use of bis(imidazolium) precursors, nucleophilic displacement reactions, and ligand editing to access unsymmetric CDC frameworks.

=== Early Deprotonation Approaches to Acyclic CDCs ===
The earliest precursors to modern CDCs were prepared in 1973 by Lach and co-workers who reported the deprotonation of highly electron-rich tetraaminoallyl cations to produce their corresponding allenetetramines. While not recognized at the time as a carbodicarbene (which would only theoretically be predicted in 2007), later investigations that focused on improving Lach's synthesis led to the recognition that these compounds behaved as CDCs.

Synthesis of tetrakis(dimethylamino)allene

=== Modern CDCs from Imidazolium Precursors ===
In 2008, Bertrand and co-workers documented the first isolation of a CDC in which the flanking substituents were known to be singlet carbenes. In an important synthesis that marked the transition to the modern era of CDC chemistry, double deprotonation of a bis(imidazolium) precursor led to the formation of the carbodicarbene as a crystalline solid. Variation of the NHC framework allowed for the formation of analogues with isopropyl, cyclohexyl, and pyridine substituents attached to the nitrogen. It was also noted that replacing one nitrogen atom in each imidazolium moiety with oxygen reduced CDC stability, possibly due to the increased electronegativity of the oxygen.

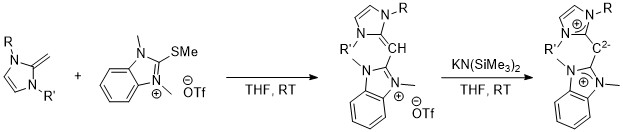
Synthesis of unsymmetric CDC frameworks via nucleophilic substitution

S_{N}2 substitution between a nucleophilic N-heterocyclic olefin and an electrophilic imidazolium salt allowed for the modular construction of unsymmetrical CDCs without resorting to double deprotonation.

=== CAAC Carbodicarbenes ===
Following initial reports of NHC-stabilized CDCs, attention turned to carbenes with greater σ-donor and π-acceptor ability, specifically CAACs. CAACs are stronger donors and more flexible than classical NHCs, which makes them well-suited for stabilizing highly electron-rich main-group centers. Synthetic schemes for CAAC-supported CDCs are similar to those of NHC analogues, broadening the structural and electronic diversity of the CDC family. Note that CAAC-based carbodicarbenes show more linear geometries, lower HOMO–LUMO gaps, and distinct redox behavior compared to the more lone-pair-localized, NHC-based systems.

== Reactivity ==
=== Basicity ===
CDCs are exceptionally strong Brønsted–Lowry bases due to the presence of two orthogonal lone pairs on the central carbon atom that can accept up to two protons from an acid. The basicity of the CDC depends on the carbene framework as well, especially in terms of second proton affinity.

=== Carbodicarbenes in Transition Metal Complexes ===
As ligands, CDCs act as exceptionally strong donors through σ and π channels. The σ-type lone pair donates strongly into metal d orbitals, similar to NHCs, but the additional π-type lone pair provides an extra pathway for electron donation that is not available to carbenes. This dual-donor character makes CDCs even stronger donors than NHCs and often results in very electron-rich metal centers.

This enhanced donation is clearly reflected in metal carbonyl spectroscopy. In rhodium and iridium carbonyl complexes bearing a CDC ligand, the carbonyl stretching frequencies are significantly lower than in analogous NHC complexes, indicating a greater degree of back-donation from metal into the CO ligand due to stronger overall electron donation from the CDC.

As well as standard ligation to metals like gold, CDCs can act as non-innocent redox ligands that stabilize highly oxidized iron, chromium and cobalt complexes due to their π-donor properties, complementary to how CAAC ligands could stabilize highly reduced ligands due to their π-acceptor properties.

Unlike carbodiphosphoranes, there has yet to be a report of geminal coordination of transition metals to CDCs.

CDCs have also been used in organometallic catalysis. Rhodium(I) complexes of CDCs have been used in diene hydro-arylation, alkylation, and amination while CDC nickel complexes have allowed for cross-coupling between aryl ethers and Grignard reagents, and nickel(0) has served as a catalytic platform for cross-coupling CDCs aryl halides. Palladium catalysts with CDC ligands can also catalyze Suzuki and Heck couplings and serve as a single-source photoredox and cross-coupling catalyst due to the CDCs' unique π-donation. Across these systems, the unifying feature is the exceptional donor strength of the CDC ligand, which enhances catalyst reactivity and stabilizes low-valent or highly electron-rich metal centers.

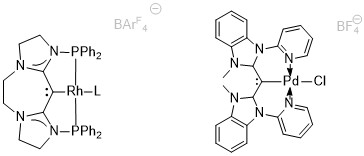
Representative examples of catalytic organometallic complexes with CDC ligands

=== Carbodicarbenes as Ligands for Main-Group Elements ===
CDCs are also powerful ligands for main group elements, where their strong σ and π donation allows them to stabilize electron-deficient or otherwise reactive main group fragments.

In the field of boron chemistry, the exploitation of CDCs' unique electronic properties has allowed for the isolation of a previously elusive three-coordinate dicationic boron hydride among other novel borenium ions and the activation of 9-BBN as a catalyst for amine methylation.

CDCs have also been used to stabilize reactive pnictogen compounds. The first example of a phosphenium trication was prepared via CDC ligands along with cationic stibenium and bismuthenium species.

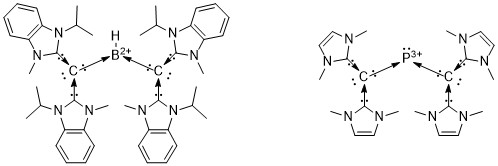
Examples of CDC frameworks coordinating to main group elements

They are also effective ligands for highly reactive light main-group elements. In beryllium chemistry, CDC ligands support the formation of beryllacycles and promote reactions such as C–H activation and ring expansion.

=== Small-Molecule Activation ===
The nucleophilic and basic character of CDCs through engaging in both σ-type nucleophilic attack and π-type stabilization of reactive intermediates. CDCs can undergo electrophilic additions with a wide range of electrophiles. Surprisingly, CDCs have also been shown to be reactive with E-H bonds (where E = B, C, and Si), indicative of a low-lying empty p-orbital. CDCs can also form an adduct with BPh_{3} to access Frustrated Lewis pair (FLP) reactivity for small molecule activation and catalytic ketone reduction.

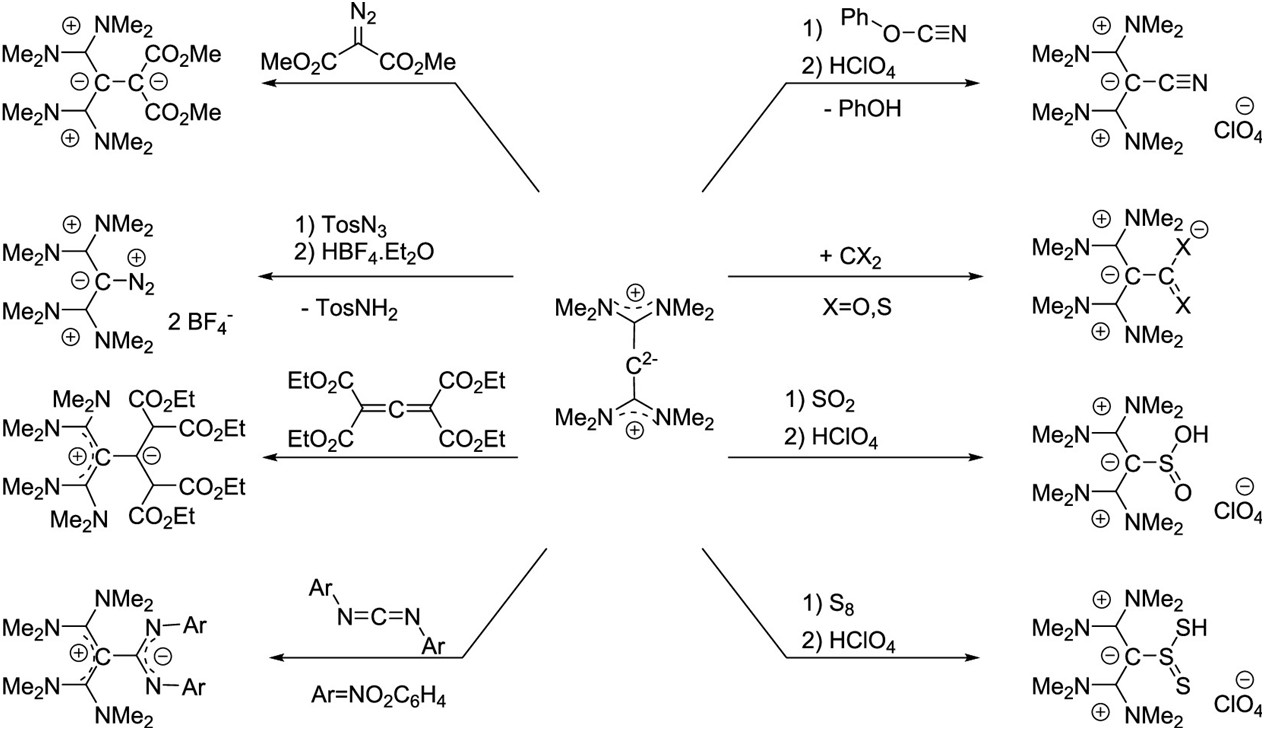
Small molecule activation reactivity of representative CDC (adapted from Fustier-Boutignon et al., 2019)
