= Z-Ligand =

Covalent bond classification

In covalent bond classification, a Z-type ligand refers to a ligand that accepts two electrons from the metal center. This is in contrast to X-type ligands, which form a bond with the ligand and metal center each donating one electron, and L-type ligands, which form a bond with the ligand donating two electrons. Typically, these Z-type ligands are Lewis acids, or electron acceptors. They are also known as zero-electron reagents.

== History ==
The ability of Lewis acids to coordinate to transition metals as σ-acceptor ligands was recognized as early as in the 1970s, but the so-called Z-type ligands remained curiosities until the early 2000s. Over the last decade, significant progress has been made in this area, especially via the incorporation of Lewis acid moieties into multidentate, ambiphilic ligands. The understanding of the nature and influence of metal→Z-ligand interactions has considerably improved and the scope of Lewis acids susceptible to behave as σ-acceptor ligands has been significantly extended.

== Bonding ==
Owing to the vacant orbital present in Z-ligands, many have incomplete octets which allow them to readily accept a pair of electrons from other atoms. A Z‑function ligand interacts with a metal center via a dative covalent bond, differing from the L‑function in that both electrons are donated by the metal rather than the ligand. As such, Z-ligands donate zero electrons to a metal center because they tend to be strong electron acceptors.

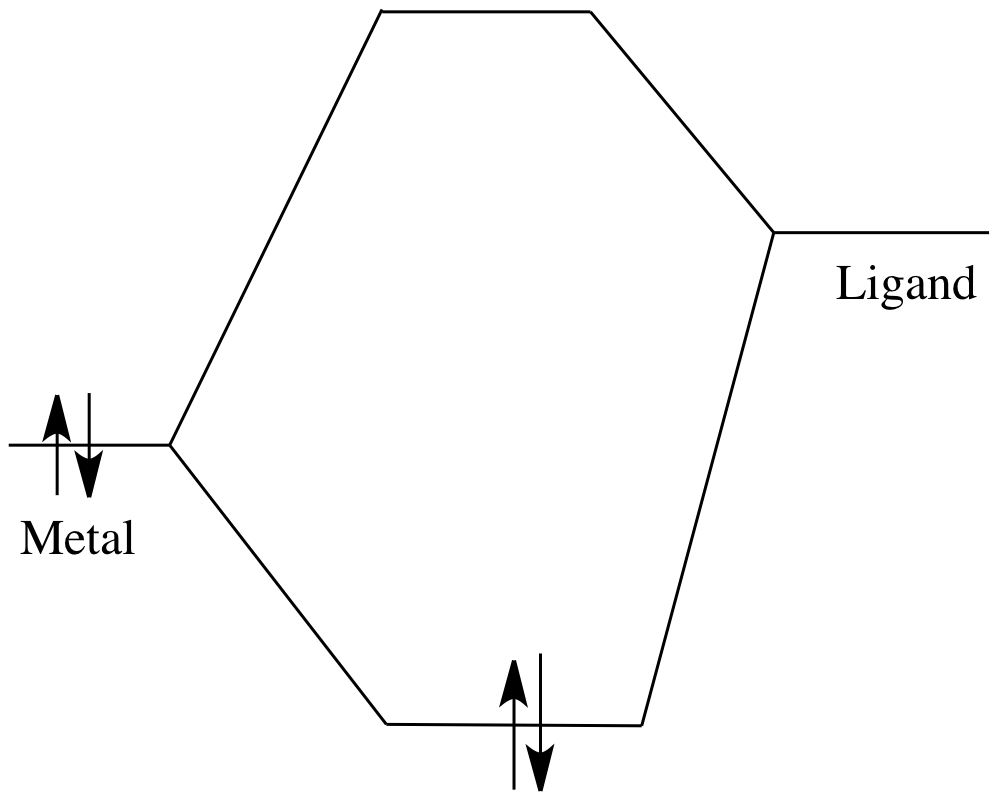
Molecular orbital diagram showing the dative bond character between the metal center and Z-ligand

Although many Z-ligands are Lewis acids, they behave as neutral ligands in the complex without contributing to the overall charge present on the complex. But since the metal uses two of its electrons in forming the metal-ligand bond, the Z-ligand raises the valence of the metal center by two units. This means that presence of the Z-ligands change the d^{n} configuration of the complex without changing the total e^{−} count.

A Z-ligand is usually accompanied by an L-ligand, as the presence of the L-ligand adds stability to the complex. As the electrons are being donated from the central metal atom to the Z-ligand, the L-ligand donates its pair of electrons to the metal atom. This unique type of bonding existing between two different ligands and the metal atom renders the complexes stable when present with a strong sigma donor ligand. In such complexes, the L and Z ligands can be written in terms of X. For example, if one Z-ligand is accompanied by one L type ligand, it can be written as a complex containing two X type ligands; i.e. MLZ type complex becomes an MX_{2} type.

== Geometry and bond character ==
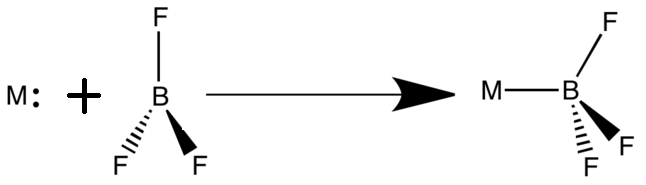
The bond geometry change for a planar BF_{3} molecule when bound to a metal.

Many of the simplest Z-ligands are simple Lewis acids with electron-deficient center atoms such as BX_{3}, BH_{3}, BR_{3}, AlX_{3}, etc. While these molecules typically have trigonal planar geometry, when bonded to a metal center, they become tetrahedral. This geometry change can be stabilized by the addition of an L-ligand on the metal center. The electrons donated from the L-ligand stabilize the Lewis acid into a tetrahedral form. Therefore, these Z-ligands can attack at (a) the metal (even in 18 electron compounds), (b) the metal-ligand bond, or (c) the ligands.
In addition to the simple Lewis acids, there are several complex molecules that can act as both L- and Z-ligands. These are referred to donor buttresses, and are typically formed when large boron-alkyl molecules complex with a metal center.

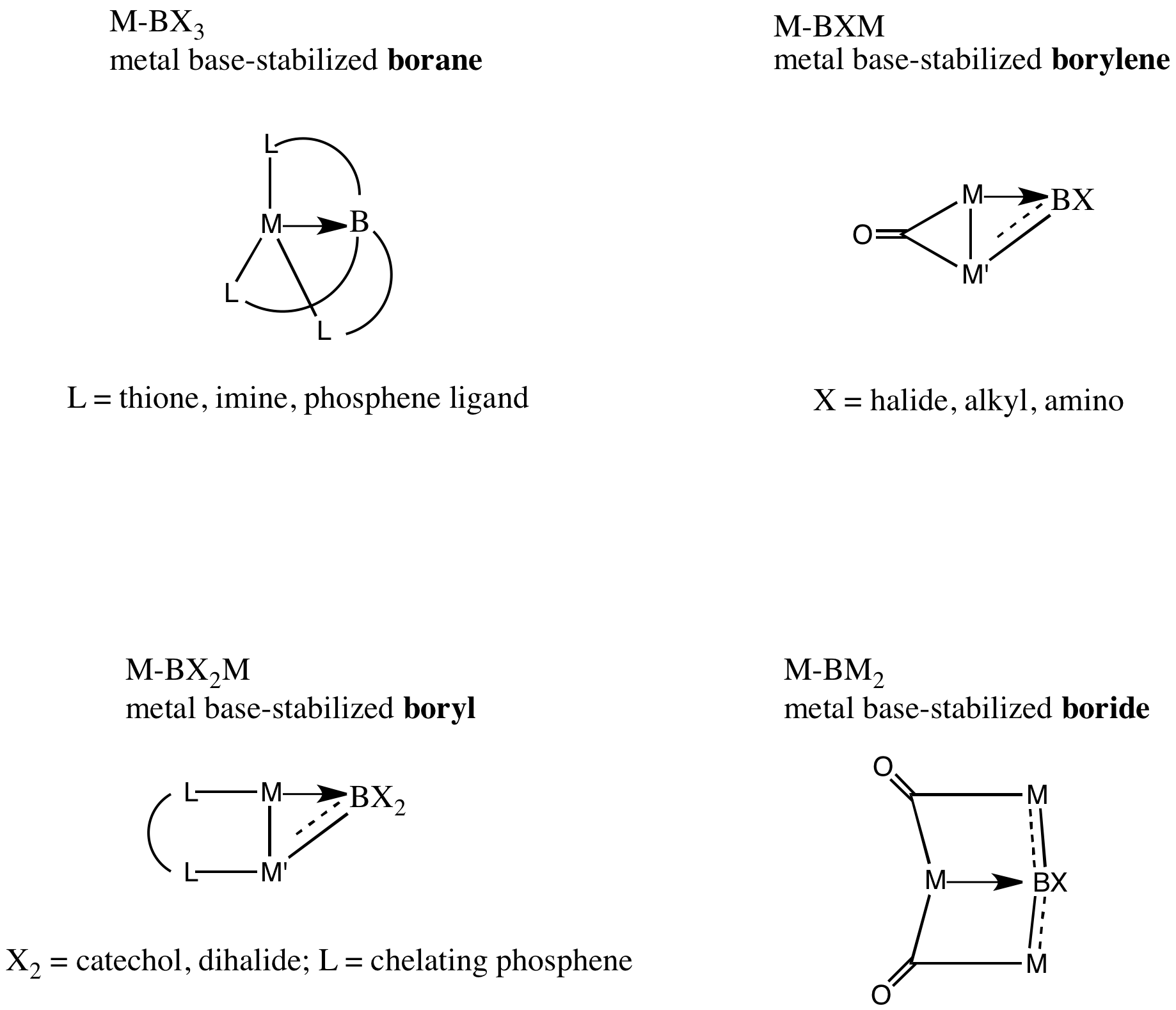
Bonding motifs for metal base-stabilized boron Z-ligands.

In addition to the geometry changes involved in the dative bonding from the metal to the Z-ligand complex, the bond itself can differ greatly depending on the type of buttresses involved. Typical boron-boron bonds are around 1.59 Å. However, due to the dative bond character, the metal-boron bond distance can vary greatly depending on the bonding motif, as well as the various ligands attached to the metal. The boride and borylene motifs tend to have the shortest bonds, typically from 2.00 to 2.15 Å. Boryl complexes have metal-boron bond distances from 2.45 to 2.52 Å, and borane complexes have the largest range of metal-boron bond distances, 2.07-2.91 Å. In addition, for the metal base-stabilized borane complexes, the L-ligand that donates to the metal center plays an important role in the metal-boron bond length. Typically, the donor buttresses with sulfur and nitrogen donor ligands have metal-boron bond lengths of 2.05-2.25 Å, and donor buttresses with phosphorus donor ligands have metal-boron bond lengths of 2.17-2.91 Å.

== Reaction ==
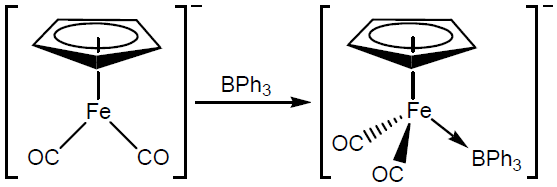
A specific example of a M-Z bond wherein other L-ligands are present in the complex

Both uncharged transition metal complexes and anionic complexes lead to the required adducts with acidic boranes. On the right is a typical reaction of a Z-ligand where the electron deficit BPh_{3} adds to the anionic Fe complex. The presence of Cp and CO ligands further stabilize the Fe-BPh_{3} bond. More specific examples include [NEt_{4}][CpFe(CO)_{2}] which gives the anionic borane iron complex as an amorphous solid from reaction with BPh_{3} in diethyl ether. This could even be characterized in solution by a high-field shifted ^{11}B-NMR signal at −28.8 characteristic of fourfold coordinated boron.

== Examples ==
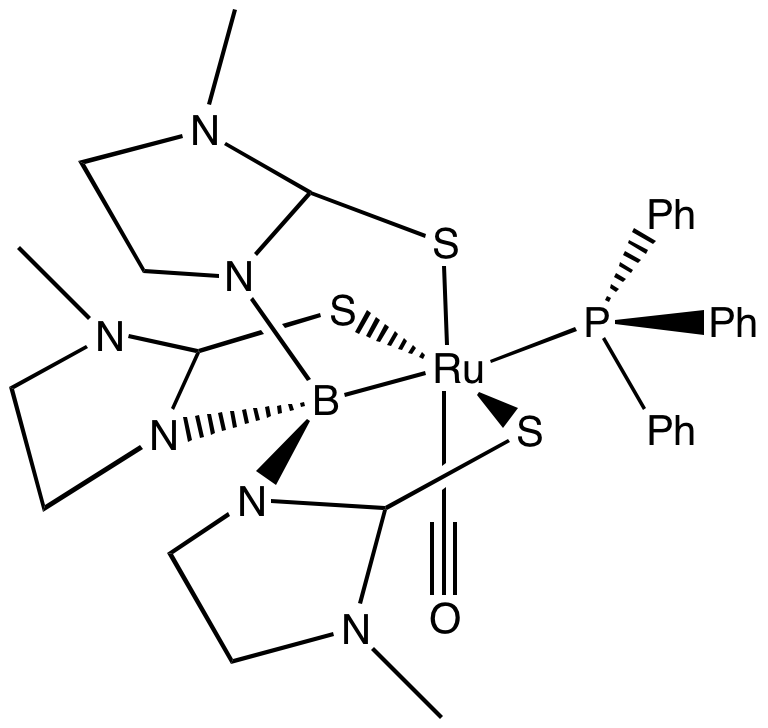
One example of a metal base-stabilized borane.

Most examples of Z-ligands are boron-centered molecules. These can range from the simple BX_{3} molecules such as BF_{3}, BH_{3}, BCl_{3}, and BR_{3}, to the more complex boron-centered molecules such as B(C_{6}F_{5})_{3}. In addition, there are many complex boron-centered molecules that act as multiple ligands on a single metal atom, forming "scaffolding" structures. One such structure is shown to the right. Other molecules that act as Z-ligands are AlCl_{3}, AlR_{3}, SO_{2}, H^{+}, Me^{+}, CPh_{3}, HgX_{2}, Cu^{+}, Ag+, CO_{2} and certain silanes.
