= Ligand bond number =

Ligand bond number (LBN) represents the effective total number of ligands or ligand attachment points surrounding a metal center, labeled M. More simply, it represents the number of coordination sites occupied on the metal. Based on the covalent bond classification method (from where LBN is derived), the equation for determining ligand bond number is as follows:

LBN = L + X + Z

Where L represents the number of neutral ligands adding two electrons to the metal center (typically lone electron pairs, pi-bonds and sigma bonds. Most encountered ligands will fall under this category. X represents covalent-bonding ligands such as halogen anions. Z represents, though rarely encountered electron accepting ligands or dative bond forming ligands. The ligand bond number convention is most commonly encountered within inorganic chemistry and it's related fields organometallic chemistry and bioinorganic chemistry.

== Comparisons with Coordination Number ==
On comparison to the classical coordination numbers, some major differences can be seen. For example, (η^{5}–cyclopentadienyl)_{2}Cr (ML_{4}X_{2}) and (η^{6}–benzene)_{2}Cr (ML_{6}) both have a LBN of 6 as compared to classical coordination numbers of 10 and 12. Well known complexes such as Ferrocene and Uranocene also serve as examples where LBN and coordination number differ. Ferrocene has two η^{5} cyclopentadienyl ligands while Uranocene has two η^{8} cyclooctatetraene ligands; however, by covalent bond classification the complexes are found to be ML_{4}X_{2} and ML_{6}X_{4}. This corresponds to LBN values of 6 and 10 respectively, even though the total coordination numbers would be 10 and 16. The usefulness of LBN to describe bonding extends beyond just sandwich compounds. Co(CO)_{3}(NO) is a stable 18-electron complex in part due to the bonding of the NO ligand in its linear form. The donation of the lone pair on the nitrogen makes this complex ML_{4}X, containing 18 electrons. The traditional coordination number here would be 4, while the CBC more accurately describes the bonding with a LBN of 5. In simple cases, the LBN is often equal to the classical coordination number (ex. Fe(CO)_{5}, etc.)

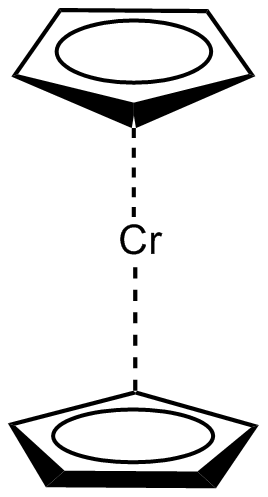
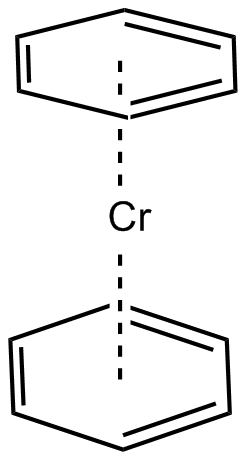
Example of Chromium coordination complexes with differing LBN and Cord#.

Left (η^{5}–cyclopentadienyl)_{2}Cr: LBN of 6, Coordination # of 10

Right (η^{6}–benzene)_{2}Cr: LBN of 6, Coordination # of 12

== Ligand bond plots ==
The LBN for transition metals trends downward from left to right across the periodic table. This trend is highlighted in the LBN plots of Groups 3 through 10. Groups exhibit trends, but the LBN for individual complexes can vary.

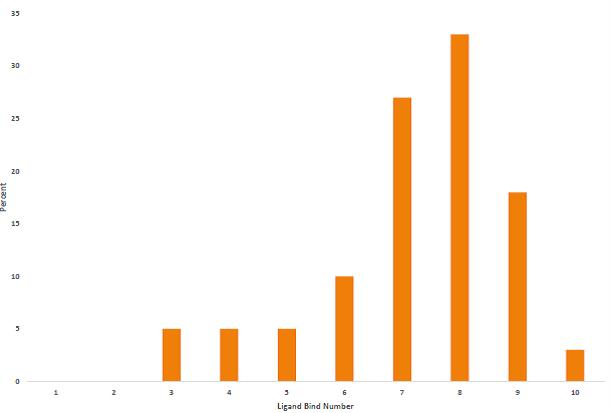

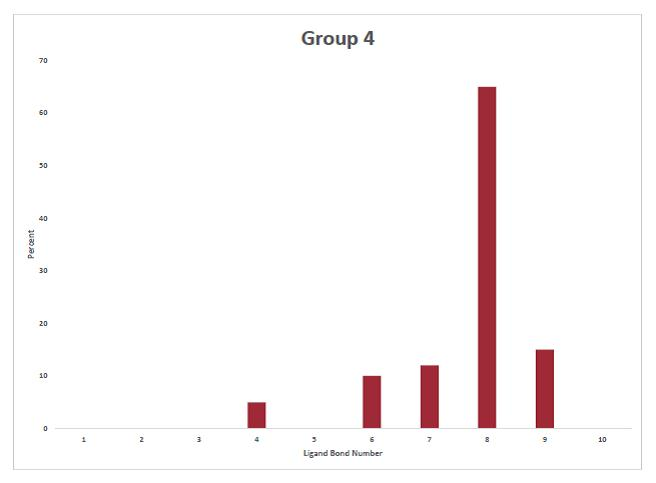

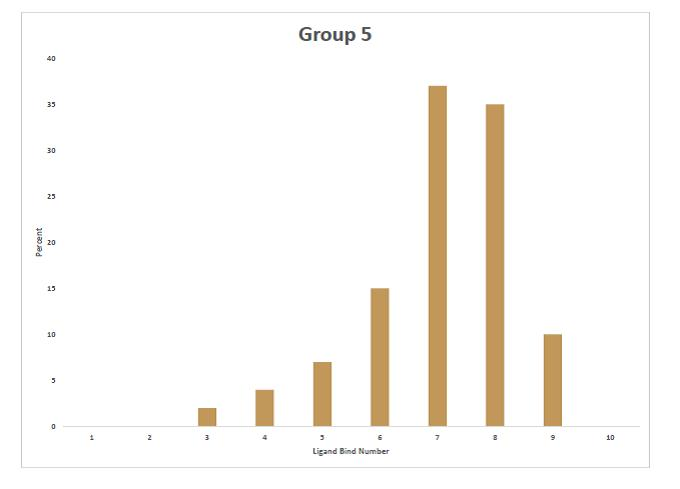

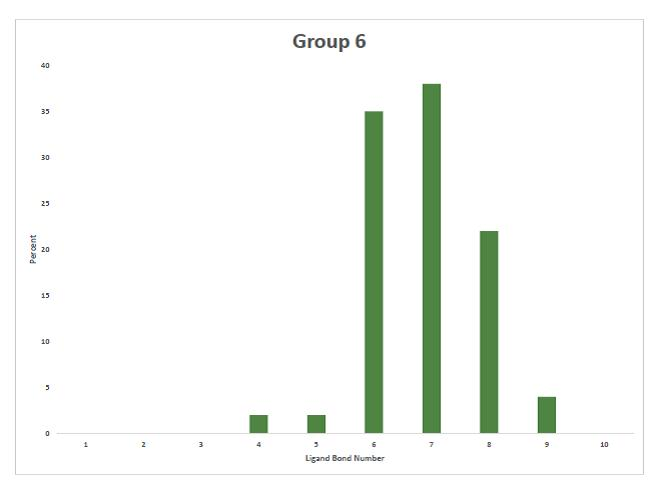

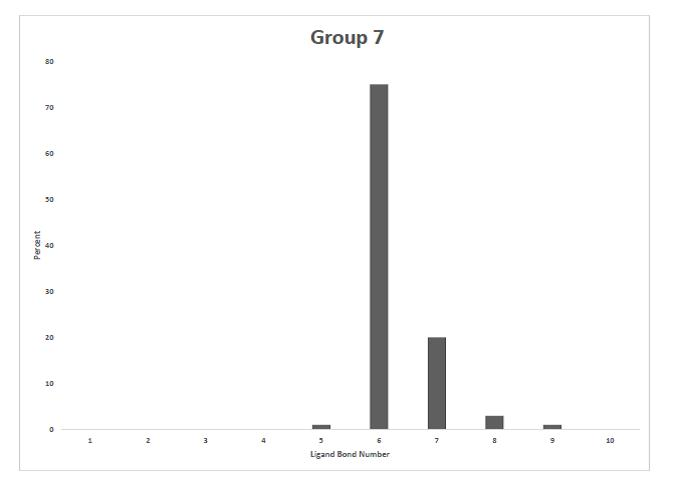

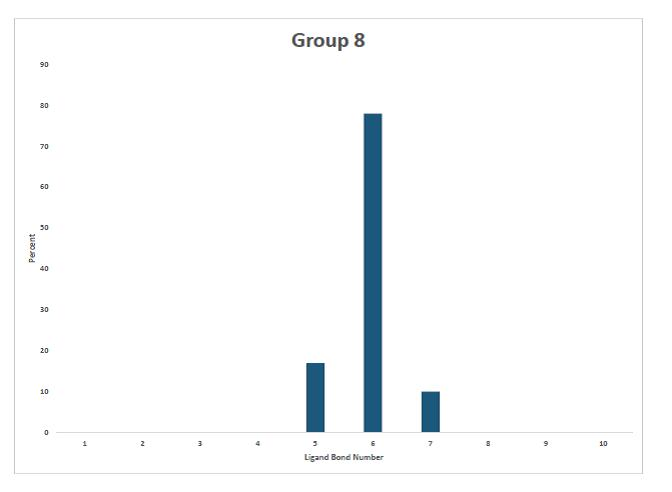

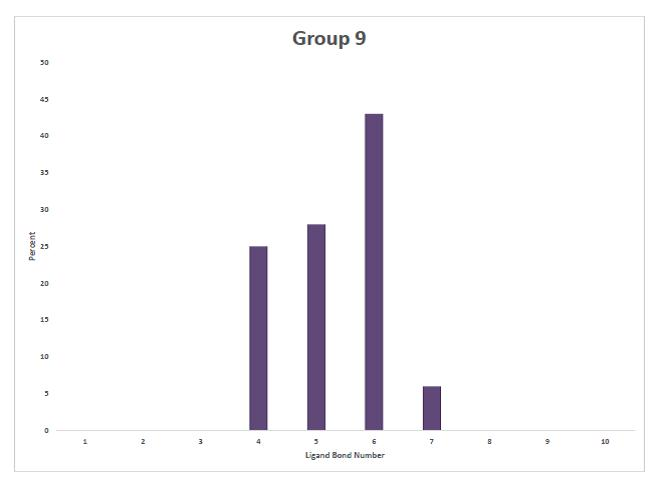

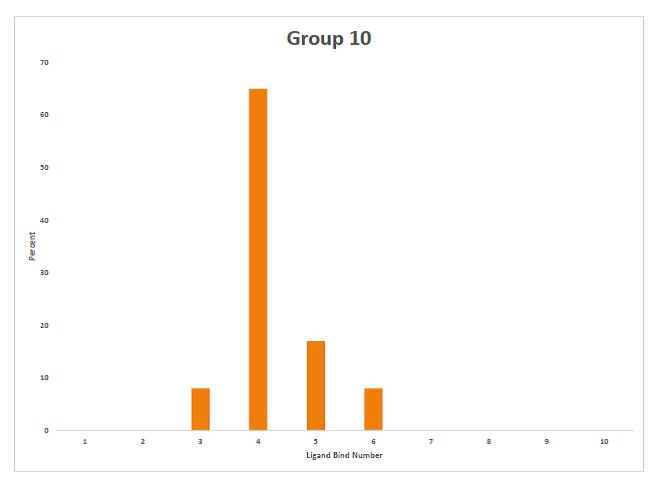
