= Kenichi Fukui =

Japanese chemist (1918–1998)

- 福井 謙一
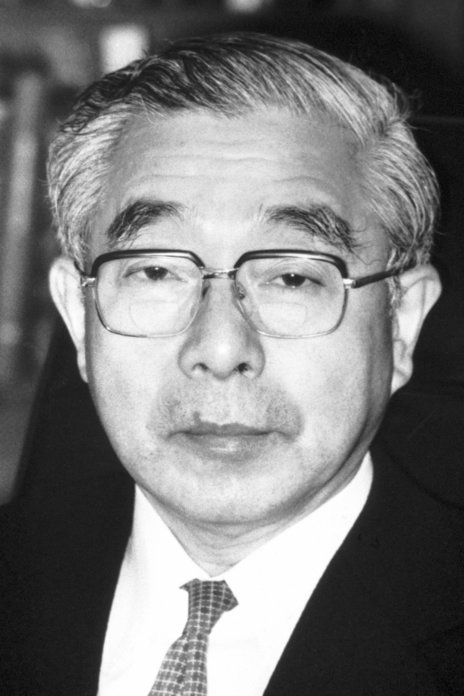
- Born: October 4, 1918; Ikoma District, Nara, Japan
- Died: January 9, 1998 (aged 79); Kyoto, Japan
- Education: Kyoto Imperial University
- Known for: Frontier orbitals Fukui function
- Spouse: Tomoe Horie (m.1947)
- Children: Tetsuya Fukui(son) and Miyako Fukui(daughter)
- Awards: Nobel Prize in Chemistry (1981); Order of Culture (1981); Grand Cordon of the Order of the Rising Sun (1988)
- Scientific career
- Fields: Chemistry
- Workplaces: Kyoto Institute of Technology, Kyoto University
- Doctoral advisor: Shinjiro Kodama
- Doctoral students: Keiji Morokuma; Gernot Frenking

Kenichi Fukui (福井 謙一, Fukui Ken'ichi; October 4, 1918 – January 9, 1998) was a Japanese chemist. He became the first person of East Asian ancestry to be awarded the Nobel Prize in Chemistry when he won the 1981 prize with Roald Hoffmann, for their independent investigations into the mechanisms of chemical reactions. Fukui's prize-winning work focused on the role of frontier orbitals in chemical reactions: specifically that molecules share loosely bonded electrons which occupy the frontier orbitals, that is, the Highest Occupied Molecular Orbital (HOMO) and the Lowest Unoccupied Molecular Orbital (LUMO).

== Early life ==
Fukui was the eldest of three sons of Ryokichi Fukui, a foreign trade merchant, and Chie Fukui. He was born in Nara, Japan. In his student days between 1938 and 1941, Fukui's interest was stimulated by quantum mechanics and Erwin Schrödinger's equation. He also had developed the belief that a breakthrough in science occurs through the unexpected fusion of remotely related fields.

In an interview with The Chemical Intelligencer Kenichi discusses his path towards chemistry starting from middle school.

"The reason for my selection of chemistry is not easy to explain, since chemistry was never my favorite branch in middle school and high school years. Actually, the fact that my respected Fabre had been a genius in chemistry had captured my heart latently, the most decisive occurrence in my education career came when my father asked the advice of Professor Gen-itsu Kita of the Kyoto Imperial University concerning the cause I should take.”

On the advice of Kita, a personal friend of the elder Fukui, young Kenichi was directed to the Department of Industrial Chemistry, with which Kita was then affiliated. He also explains that chemistry was difficult to him because it seemed to require memorization to learn it, and that he preferred more logical character in chemistry. He followed the advice a mentor that was well respected by Kenichi himself and never looked back. He also followed in those footsteps by attending Kyoto University in Japan. During that same interview Kenichi also discussed his reason for preferring more theoretical chemistry rather than experimental chemistry. Although he certainly acceded at theoretical science he actually spent much of his early research on experimental. Kenichi had quickly completed more than 100 experimental projects and papers, and he rather enjoyed the experimental phenomena of chemistry. In fact, later on when teaching he would recommend experimental thesis projects for his students to balance them out, theoretical science came more natural to students, but by suggesting or assigning experimental projects his students could understand the concept of both, as all scientist should. Following his graduation from Kyoto Imperial University in 1941, Fukui was engaged in the Army Fuel Laboratory of Japan during World War II. In 1943, he was appointed a lecturer in fuel chemistry at Kyoto Imperial University and began his career as an experimental organic chemist.

== Research ==
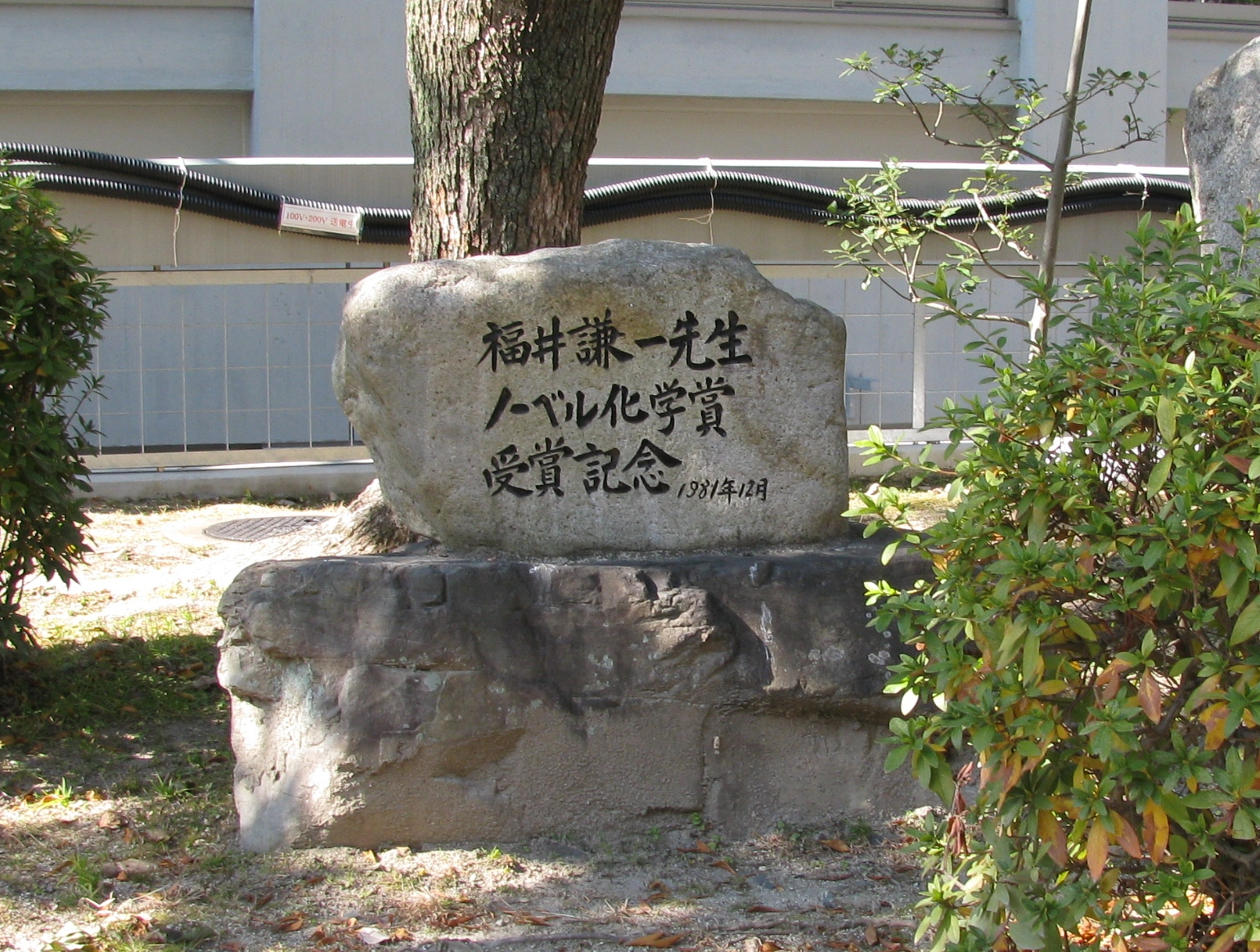
Kenichi Fukui Monument at Kyoto University

He was professor of physical chemistry at Kyoto University from 1951 to 1982, president of the Kyoto Institute of Technology between 1982 and 1988, and a member of the International Academy of Quantum Molecular Science and honorary member of the International Academy of Science, Munich. He was also director of the Institute for Fundamental Chemistry from 1988 till his death. As well as President of the Chemical Society of Japan from 1983–84, receiving multiple awards aside from his Nobel Prize such as; Japan Academy Prize in 1962, Person of Cultural Merit in 1981, Imperial Honour of Grand Cordon of the Order of the Rising Sun in 1988, with many other awards not quite as prestigious.

In 1952, Fukui with his young collaborators T. Yonezawa and H. Shingu presented his molecular orbital theory of reactivity in aromatic hydrocarbons, which appeared in the Journal of Chemical Physics. At that time, his concept failed to garner adequate attention among chemists. Fukui observed in his Nobel lecture in 1981 that his original paper 'received a number of controversial comments. This was in a sense understandable, because for lack of my experiential ability, the theoretical foundation for this conspicuous result was obscure or rather improperly given.'

The frontier orbitals concept came to be recognized following the 1965 publication by Robert B. Woodward and Roald Hoffmann of the Woodward-Hoffmann stereoselection rules, which could predict the reaction rates between two reactants. These rules, depicted in diagrams, explain why some pairs react easily while other pairs do not. The basis for these rules lies in the symmetry properties of the molecules and especially in the disposition of their electrons. Fukui had acknowledged in his Nobel lecture that, 'It is only after the remarkable appearance of the brilliant work by Woodward and Hoffmann that I have become fully aware that not only the density distribution but also the nodal property of the particular orbitals have significance in such a wide variety of chemical reactions.'

What has been striking in Fukui's significant contributions is that he developed his ideas before chemists had access to large computers for modeling. Apart from exploring the theory of chemical reactions, Fukui's contributions to chemistry also include the statistical theory of gelation, organic synthesis by inorganic salts and polymerization kinetics.

In an interview to New Scientist magazine in 1985, Fukui had been highly critical on the practices adopted in Japanese universities and industries to foster science. He noted, "Japanese universities have a chair system that is a fixed hierarchy. This has its merits when trying to work as a laboratory on one theme. But if you want to do original work you must start young, and young people are limited by the chair system. Even if students cannot become assistant professors at an early age they should be encouraged to do original work." Fukui also admonished Japanese industrial research stating, "Industry is more likely to put its research effort into its daily business. It is very difficult for it to become involved in pure chemistry. There is a need to encourage long-range research, even if we don't know its goal and if its application is unknown." In another interview with The Chemical Intelligencer he further elaborates on his criticism by saying, "As is known worldwide, Japan has tried to catch up with the western countries since the beginning of this century by importing science from them." Japan is, in a sense, relatively new to fundamental science as a part of its society and the lack of originality ability, and funding which the western countries have more advantages in hurt the country in fundamental science. Although, he has also stated that it is improving in Japan, especially funding for fundamental science as it has seen a steady increase for years.

== Recognition ==
Fukui was awarded the Nobel Prize for his realization that a good approximation for reactivity could be found by looking at the frontier orbitals (HOMO/LUMO). This was based on three main observations of molecular orbital theory as two molecules interact.

1. The occupied orbitals of different molecules repel each other.
2. Positive charges of one molecule attract the negative charges of the other.
3. The occupied orbitals of one molecule and the unoccupied orbitals of the other (especially HOMO and LUMO) interact with each other causing attraction.

From these observations, frontier molecular orbital (FMO) theory simplifies reactivity to interactions between HOMO of one species and the LUMO of the other. This helps to explain the predictions of the Woodward-Hoffman rules for thermal pericyclic reactions, which are summarized in the following statement: "A ground-state pericyclic change is symmetry-allowed when the total number of (4q+2)s and (4r)a components is odd"

Fukui was elected a Foreign Member of the Royal Society (ForMemRS) in 1989.

== Bibliography ==
- Fukui, Kenichi (1975). Theory of Orientation and Stereoselection. Berlin, Heidelberg: Springer Berlin Heidelberg. ISBN 978-3-642-61917-5. OCLC 851731799.
- Fukui, Ken'ichi (1984). Gakumon no sōzō (in Japanese) (Shohan ed.). Tōkyō: Kōsei Shuppansha. ISBN 4-333-01143-4. OCLC 15398674.
- Fukui, Ken'ichi (1997). Frontier orbitals and reaction paths : selected papers of Kenichi Fukui. Hiroshi Fujimoto. Singapore: World Scientific. ISBN 978-981-279-584-7. OCLC 827945034.
- Tanaka, Kazuyoshi; Yamabe, Tokio; Fukui, Ken'ichi, eds. (1999). The science and technology of carbon nanotubes. Amsterdam: Elsevier. ISBN 978-0-08-042696-9. OCLC 162135808.

== See also ==
- List of Japanese Nobel laureates
- List of Nobel laureates affiliated with Kyoto University
