= Gernot Frenking =

German chemist

- Born: January 23, 1946 (age 80); Körbecke, Germany
- Education: RWTH Aachen; Kyoto University; Technische Universität Berlin
- Scientific career
- Institutions: Technische Universität Berlin; University of Marburg
- Doctoral advisor: Helmut Schwarz
- Other academic advisors: Hans-Dieter Scharf; Kenichi Fukui
- Website: Personal website at Marburg

Gernot Frenking (born January 23, 1946, in Körbecke) is a German chemist known for his contribution in theoretical chemistry.

== Education and life ==
From 1960 to 1964, Frenking initially trained as a chemical laboratory assistant at the Bayer AG paint factory in Uerdingen. He completed his Abitur on the second educational path and studied chemistry at the RWTH Aachen from 1969 to 1973. In 1973 he received his diploma at the RWTH Aachen with Hans-Dieter Scharf with a thesis on calculations of chemical reactivity using quantum theoretical models as well as measurements and theoretical calculations on the dipole moments of some compounds.

From 1973 to 1976, Frenking was a DAAD fellow in Japan with Kenichi Fukui at Kyoto University, where he worked on frontier orbital theory. In Japan, Frenking was also one of the first scholarship holders of the Japan Society for the Promotion of Science (JSPS), the largest Japanese research funding society. From 1976 to 1979 he was a doctoral student at the Institute for Organic Chemistry at Technische Universität Berlin, where he received his doctorate in 1979. From 1977 to 1982 he was an assistant at the TU Berlin with teaching duties. Between 1979 and 1984 he researched with Helmut Schwarz for his habilitation in the field of theoretical organic chemistry and habilitated with a thesis on MO-SCF investigations on the structure and reactivity of molecules in the gas phase. From 1982 to 1984 he worked at TU Berlin with a Liebig scholarship from the Chemical Industry Fund. Frenking went to the Stanford Research Institute (SRI International) on the American west coast as a postdoc. There, with Gilda Loew, he researched structure-activity relationships of biologically active compounds, in particular opiates, in theoretical investigations until 1988 and carried out conformational investigations using molecular mechanics calculations of pharmaceutically interesting compounds.

After returning to Germany, he was briefly a scientist at the Collaborative Research Center 260 in the Chemistry Department of the University of Marburg. In 1990, Frenking was appointed C3 professor for computer applications in chemistry at the University of Marburg, and in 1998 he became C4 professor for theoretical chemistry there.

== Honors and awards ==
- JSPS Scholarship (1974)
- Clemens Winkler Lecture, Freiberg University of Mining and Technology (2007)
- Elhuyar Goldschmidt Award of the Spanish Royal Society of Chemistry (2007)
- Fellow of the Royal Society of Chemistry (FSRC) (since 2008)
- Schrödinger Medal of the World Association of Theoretical and Computational Chemists (2009)
- Lise Meitner Lectureship at the Hebrew University of Jerusalem (2011)
- Hans Hellmann Research Award at the University of Marburg (2012)
- Richard W. Bader Memorial Lecture, MIRCE Akademy, Exeter, UK (2013)
- Erich Hückel Prize from the German Chemical Society (2020)
