= Covalent bond classification method =

Chemical notation

The covalent bond classification (CBC) method, also referred to as LXZ notation, is a way of describing covalent compounds such as organometallic complexes in a way that is not prone to limitations resulting from the definition of oxidation state. Instead of simply assigning a charge (oxidation state) to an atom in the molecule, the covalent bond classification method analyzes the nature of the ligands surrounding the atom of interest. According to this method, the interactions that allow for coordination of the ligand can be classified according to whether it donates two, one, or zero electrons. These three classes of ligands are respectively given the symbols L, X, and Z. The method was published by Malcolm L. H. Green in 1995.

== Types of ligands ==
X-type ligands are those that donate one electron to the metal and accept one electron from the metal when using the neutral ligand method of electron counting, or donate two electrons to the metal when using the donor pair method of electron counting. Regardless of whether they are considered neutral or anionic, these ligands yield normal covalent bonds. A few examples of this type of ligand are H, halogens (Cl, Br, F, etc.), OH, CN, CH_{3}, and NO (bent).

L-type ligands are neutral ligands that donate two electrons to the metal center, regardless of the electron counting method being used. These electrons can come from lone pairs, pi, or sigma donors. The bonds formed between these ligands and the metal are dative covalent bonds, which are also known as coordinate bonds. Examples of this type of ligand include CO, PR_{3}, NH_{3}, H_{2}O, carbenes (=CRR'), and alkenes.

Z-type ligands are those that accept two electrons from the metal center, as opposed to the donation occurring with the other two types of ligands. However, these ligands also form dative covalent bonds like the L-type. This type of ligand is not usually used because in certain situations it can be written in terms of L and X. For example, if a Z ligand is accompanied by an L type, it can be written as X_{2}. Examples of these ligands are Lewis acids, such as BR_{3}.

== Uses of the notation ==
When given a metal complex and the trends for the ligand types, the complex can be written in a more simplified manner with the form [ML_{l}X_{x}Z_{z}]^{Q±}. The subscripts represent the numbers of each ligand type present in that complex, M is the metal center, and Q is the overall charge on the complex. Some examples of this overall notation are as follows:

Condensed formula	LXZ notation
[Mn(CO)_{6}]^{+}	[ML_{6}]^{+}
[Ir(CO)(PPh_{3})_{2}(Cl)(NO)]^{2+}	[ML_{3}X_{2}]^{2+}
[Fe(CO)_{2}(CN)_{4}]^{2−}	[ML_{2}X_{4}]^{2−}

Also from this general form, the values for electron count, oxidation state, coordination number, number of d-electrons, valence number and the ligand bond number can be calculated.

Electron Count = $N + x + 2l - Q$

Where N is the group number of the metal.

Oxidation State (OS) = $x + Q$

Coordination Number (CN) = $x + l$

Number of d-electrons (dn) = $N- OS$
= $N- (x + Q)$

Valence Number (VN) = $x + 2z$

Ligand Bond Number (LBN) = $l + x + z$

=== Other uses ===
This template for writing a metal complex also allows for a better comparison of molecules with different charges. This can happen when the assignment is reduced to its “equivalent neutral class". The equivalent neutral class is the classification of the complex if the charge was localized on the ligand as opposed to the metal center. In other words, the equivalent neutral class is the representation of the complex as though there were no charge.
