= Cyclic alkyl amino carbenes =

Family of chemical compounds

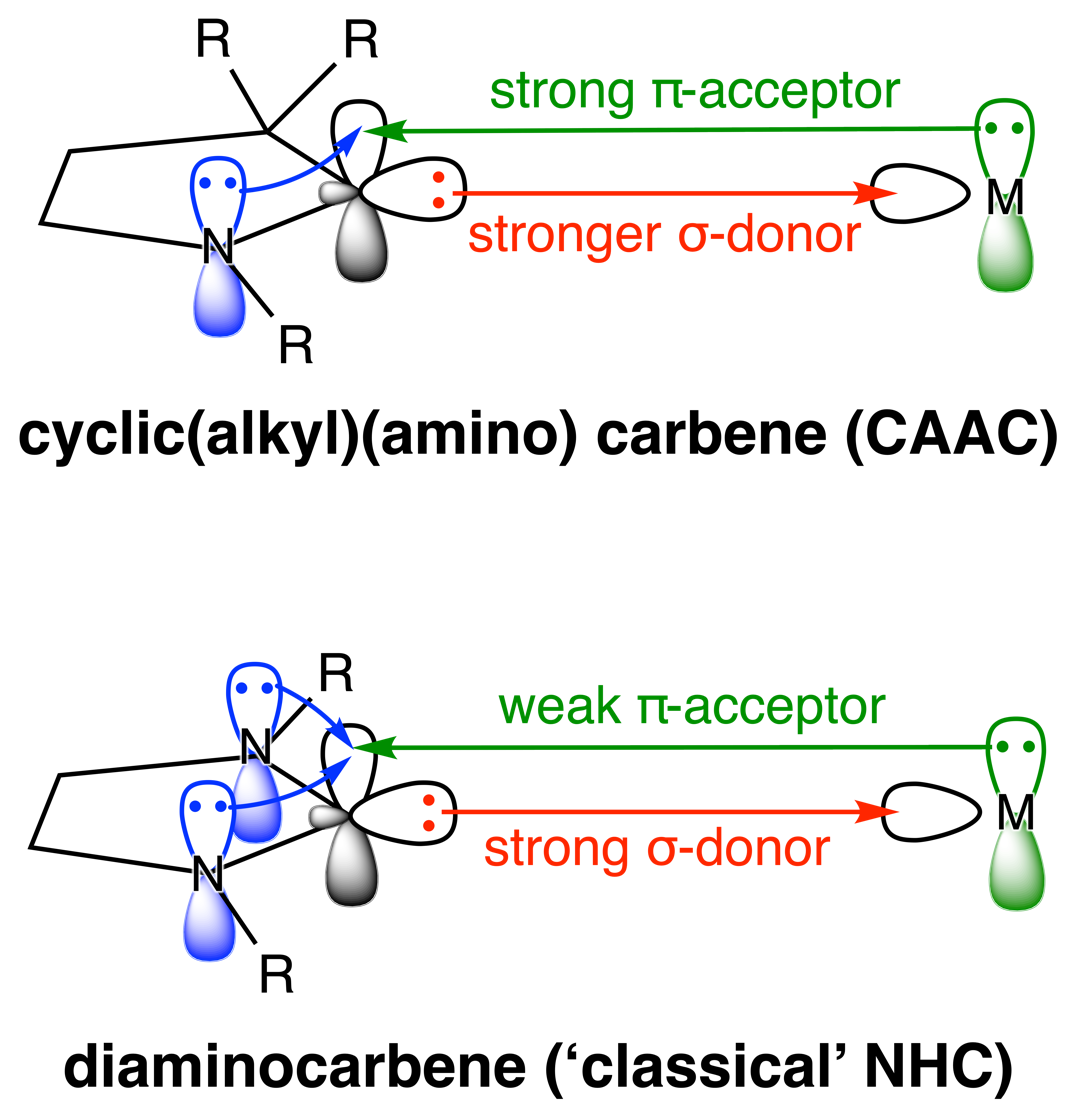
Comparison of σ-donating and π-accepting properties of classical N-heterocyclic carbenes and cyclic(alkyl)(amino) carbenes.

Cyclic(alkyl)(amino) carbenes (CAACs) are a class of stable singlet carbene ligands that feature one amino and one sp^{3} alkyl group adjacent to the carbene carbon atom. CAACs are a subset of N-heterocyclic carbenes (NHCs) in which the replacement of an amino group on the "classical" diaminocarbene with a saturated carbon atom results in a carbene ligand that is both a better σ-donor and π-acceptor than classical NHCs. The lone pair on the nitrogen atoms in classical NHCs allows for π-donation from both nitrogen atoms, while substitution of one nitrogen with a carbon atom results in weaker π-donation from only one nitrogen substituent, thus making CAACs stronger π-acceptors and more electrophilic than classical NHCs. Like NHCs, CAACs have tunable steric and electronic properties that make them versatile ligands in both transition metal and main group. CAACs have been heavily studied. CAACs form stable adducts with otherwise reactive or unstable molecules. In materials science, CAACs stabilize species that have promising photophysical properties for organic light emitting diodes (OLEDs) and have been shown to stabilize single molecule magnets (SMMs).

== Classes and synthesis of CAACs ==
=== Traditional CAACs (CAAC-5) ===
Reported by Bertrand in 2005, the first CAAC was synthesized by modification of the precursor imine formed from the reaction of 2,6-diisopropylaniline with 2-methylpropanal. This imine was deprotonated by lithium diisopropylamide (LDA) and 1,2-epoxy-2-methylpropane was then added to produce a lithium alkoxide. Addition of triflic anhydride (TfOTf) closes the cyclic system, producing an aldiminium salt that was deprotonated with LDA to yield the first CAAC "Ca".

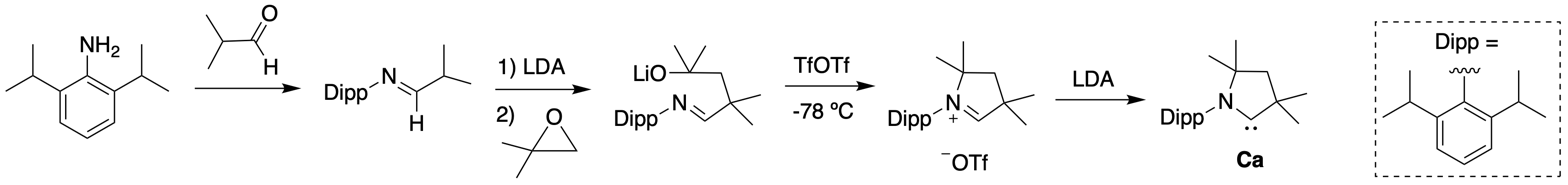
Synthesis of 5-membered CAAC (CAAC-5).

A common synthesis is the hydroiminiumation route developed by Bertrand in 2007. The precursor imine is first deprotonated by LDA, followed by addition of an alkene with a halogenated substituent to form the alkenyl imine. Heating with HCl cyclizes the alkenyl imine to yield the aldiminium salt. Most aldiminium salts have been isolated in yields over 80%. Deprotonation with a strong base such as LDA or potassium bis(trimethylsilyl)amide (KHMDS) generates the CAAC.

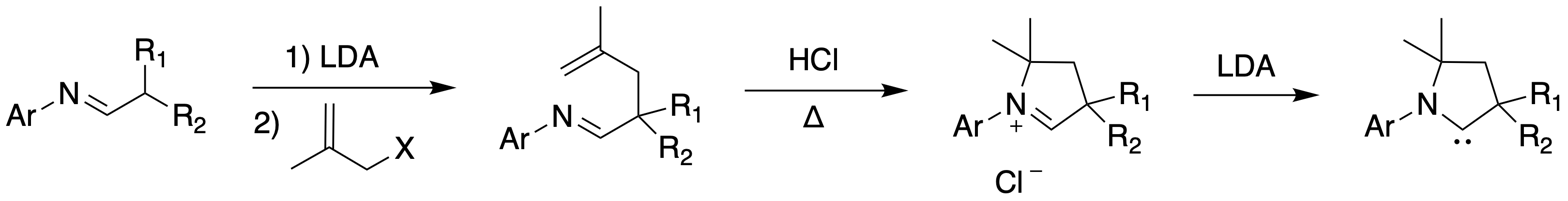
One synthetic method leading to CAAC-5.

=== Chiral CAACs ===
When the R_{1} and R_{2} are inequivalent, a chiral CAAC results.

=== Expanded ring CAACs (CAAC-6) ===
6-membered CAACs have been synthesized by slight modification to the CAAC-5 procedure; the main change is manifested in increasing the chain length of the alkene used in step 2. Modification of the backbone from CAAC-5 to CAAC-6 increases both the σ-donating and π-accepting strength of the ligand. CAAC-6 was shown to be more effective in the α-arylation of ketones with aryl chlorides than the analogous CAAC-5. Compared to Ru-CAAC-5, Six-membered Ru-CAAC-6 complexes also showed higher initiation rates for olefin metathesis, but increased steric bulk limited their catalytic activity.

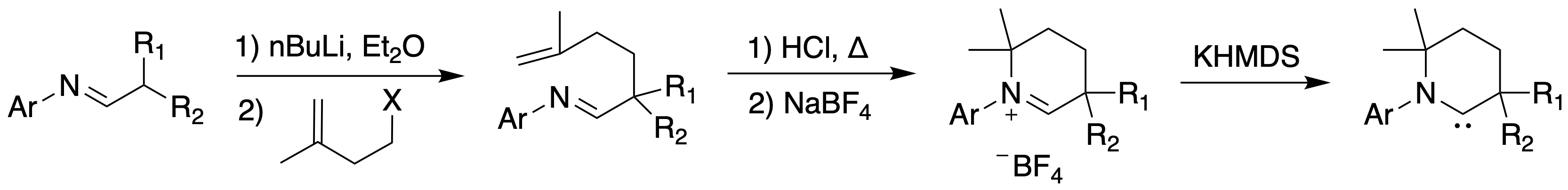
Synthesis of 6-membered CAACs (CAAC-6).

Classic diamino NHCs have been synthetically modified to produce more ambiphilic carbenes by expanding the size of the backbone. 6-, 7-, and 8-membered rings (NHC-6, NHC-7, and NHC-8, respectively) have been reported for diamino NHCs. As the size of the backbone ring increases, so does the nucleophilicity at the carbon center. The traditional 5-membered CAACs show similar nucleophilicity to the eight-membered NHC with calculated highest occupied molecular orbitals (HOMO) of 5.290 eV (CAAC-5) vs. 5.110 eV (NHC-8), decreasing the motivation to synthesize expanded ring CAACs. As a result, ring-expanded CAACs have not been widely explored.

=== Bicyclic CAACs (BICAACs) ===
Bicyclic(alkyl)(amino) carbenes (BICAACs) are CAACs containing a bicyclic backbone. The bicyclic system forces the substituents on the carbon to adopt a "fan-like" geometry closer to that of a diamino NHC. As a result, BICAACs show stronger σ-donating and π-accepting properties compared to monocyclic CAACs. To synthesize BICAACs, the starting imine contains a cyclic alkene. The synthesis then follows the hydroiminiumation route in which the cyclization by HCl results in a bicyclic aldiminium salt that is then deprotonated to form the free carbene.

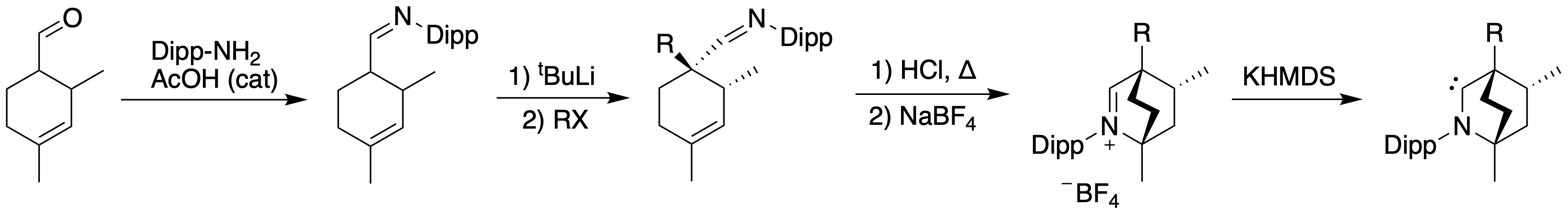
Synthetic route to bicyclic CAACs (BICAACs).

=== Bidentate CAACs ===
In 2016, the versatility of CAACs was further expanded to include bidentate CAACs containing a secondary pendant donor atom. By starting from a linear rather than a branched imine starting material, a donor group R can be added at the sp^{3} carbon by first deprotonating the carbon to be substituted using tert-butyllithium, then adding the alkene by an S_{N}2-type reaction (Scheme 5). Bidentate CAACs featuring alkene, ether, amine, imine, and phosphine donors have been reported. Bidentate CAAC-Au(I) complexes have been used for C-C oxidative addition of biphenylene. Bidentate CAAC-Cu(I) compelxes have shown promise as catalysts for hydroarylation and anti-Markovnikov hydrohydrazination reactions.

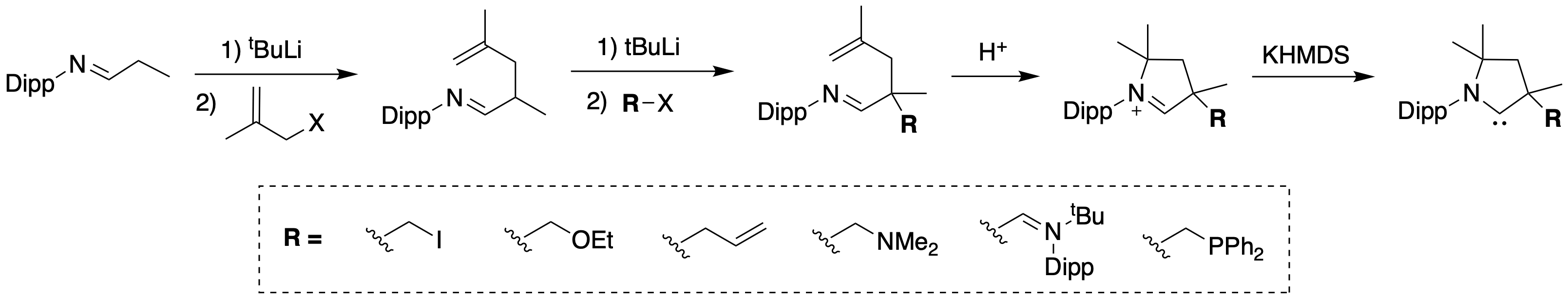
Synthetic route to bidentate CAACs.

== Properties of CAACs ==
=== Electronic properties ===
The C-O stretching frequencies of cis-[RhCl(CO)2(L)] and cis-[IrCl(CO)2(L)], where L = NHC or CAAC allows for the determination of overall donating ability of L analogous to the Tolman electronic parameter (TEP). CAACs show lower C-O stretching frequencies (2013–2036 cm^{−1}) than their NHC counterparts (2039–2049 cm^{−1}), indicating that they are stronger donors.

The π-accepting abilities of NHCs and CAACs can be compared using ^{31}P NMR shifts of the L-PPh adduct. CAACs show a downfield-shifted ^{31}P NMR signals (56.2-68.9 ppm) compared to classical NHCs (-61.2 to -10.2 ppm) for 5-membered heterocyclic carbenes. These signals indicate higher C-P bond character, and therefore better π-backbonding from the phosphinidene to the CAAC ligands. By correlation to the TEPs for these complexes, the stronger σ-donating abilities for CAACs can be extracted.

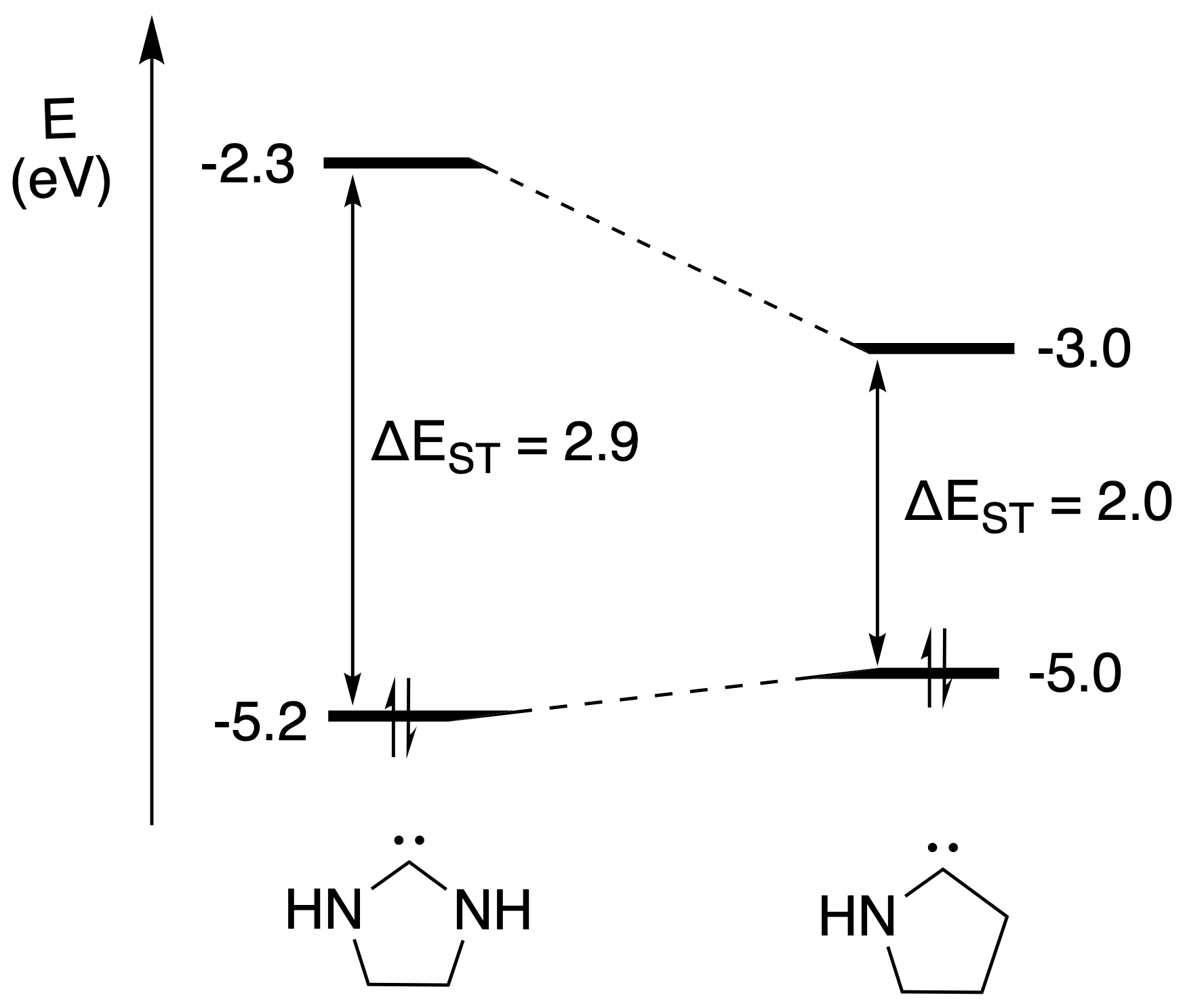
Frontier molecular orbitals of NHC-5 and CAAC-5.

The experimental superiority of σ-donor/π-acceptor CAACs compared to diaminocarbene NHCs is supported by DFT calculations of the frontier molecular orbitals of CAACs and NHCs. The more nucleophilic (higher HOMO) and electrophilic (lower LUMO) character of CAACs manifests in contraction of the singlet-triplet gap ΔE_{ST} from 285.1 kJ/mol for the saturated H-substituted NHC to 193.5 kJ/mol for the analogous saturated H-substituted CAAC.

The electronic properties of CAACs are affected by ring size. 6-membered CAACs increases the N-C-C angle, decreasing hybridization and thereby increasing p character of the carbene center. This increased p character raises the HOMO, decreasing the ΔE_{ST} further.

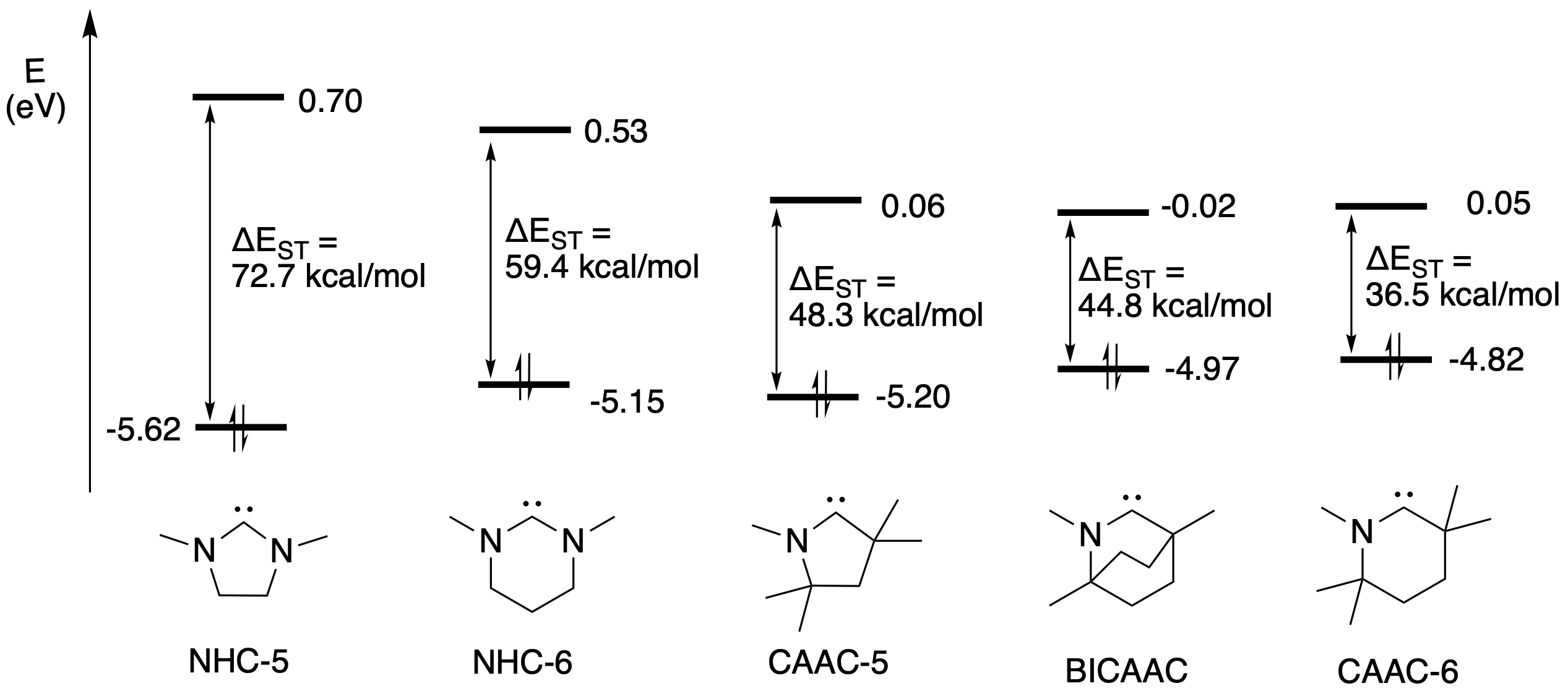
Frontier orbitals for selected NHCs and CAACs.

=== Steric properties ===
CAACs also show distinctive steric profiles. It is easy to produce symmetric NHCs, in which the N substituents are the same on either side of the carbene center. This is not the case for CAACs, which are synthesized by adding the N and C substituents in two different steps, allowing for more facile tuning of each substituent. The substituents on the carbene center are asymmetric and have differing hybridization between the sp^{2} nitrogen and sp^{3} carbon atom. This quaternary carbon atom in the α-position allows for variable steric effects by changing the substituents at both N and C.

The presence of the steric bulk at the α-position to the carbene rather than beta (attached to N) results in more steric encumberment at the carbene center. This effect is evident in the higher percent buried volume (%VBur) of CAACs compared to diamino NHCs at a distance of 0 Å from the carbene. For carbenes bearing a diiopropylphenyl group at the N substituent(s), the %VBur for CAACs (79.0-83.1) is markedly higher than the classical NHC (70.3).

This effect can be used to stabilize highly reactive main group and transition metal compounds. Because excessive steric hindrance can be an issue for some reactivity, NHCs and CAACs bearing substituents with multiple spatial conformations (e.g. cyclohexyl) offer "flexible steric bulk" for catalysis. The asymmetry of CAACs amplifies this flexible steric bulk by allowing for flexibility on only one side of the ligand. This asymmetric ligand scaffold has been exploited in developing novel catalysts for asymmetric transformations and small molecule activation.

== CAAC Stabilization of Reactive Compounds ==
A major benefit of CAACs compared to other carbene or phosphine ligands is in their ability to stabilize highly reactive complexes that could not otherwise be isolated. The strong σ-donor and π-acceptor properties, as well as the steric bulk offered by CAAC ligands has allowed for the stabilization of numerous low-valent complexes across the periodic table.

=== s-block elements ===
Adducts of CAACs with Group 1 and 2 elements have been reported and shown to enhance their catalytic and redox properties compared to the elements alone. Group 1 (alkali metal) and Group 2 (alkaline earth metal) elements are very electropositive and are often seen in the +1 or +2 oxidation state. The strong π-accepting character of CAACS allowed for the isolation of the first example of a neutral Be(0) complex, which could not be isolated by attempts with diamino NHCs. A stable low valent Mg(I) radical has been reported, supported by a CAAC ligand which localizes the unfavorable spin density.

=== d-block elements ===
Reflecting their steric bulk, CAAC's stabilize low-coordinate complexes. The 14e, Rh(I) species [RhCl(CO)(CAAC)] is one example. Other examples are [Pd(allyl)(CAAC)]^{+} and [Au(CAAC)(η^{2}-toluene)]^{+}. CAAC's form tricoordinate Co(0), Fe(0), and Mn(0) complexes. EPR evidence supports these paramagnetic complexes are stabilized by offloading spin density onto the carbene ligand.

=== p-block elements ===
CAAC ligands form a variety of complexes of Groups 13–15.

Group 13 consists of electron deficient elements that tend to behave as Lewis acids. A variety of CAAC adducts of group 13 elements have been explored. More notably, however, is the isolation of neutral group 13 radicals of B, Al, and Ga by reduction of a CAAC-MCl_{2} complex. CAACS have also been shown to stabilize nucleophilic borylenes and their corresponding radical cations.

Group 14 is dominated by organic chemistry, but CAACs have brought light to the reactivity of the heavier congeners. CAACs have been shown to stabilize more reactive carbon radicals by electron delocalization across the CAAC ligand. For instance, CAAC-stabilized carboxyl radicals can be isolated and stored at room temperature under inert atmosphere. CAACs can also stabilize bonding between the heavier group 14 and group 15 elements; numerous examples of homonuclear Si-Si, Si=Si, P-P, P=P, As-As, and Sb-Sb. Two coordinate CAAC-stabilized Sb(I) and Bi(I) carbone analogues have also been isolated; this reactivity is distinctive given the propensity for Sb and Bi complexes to dimerize.

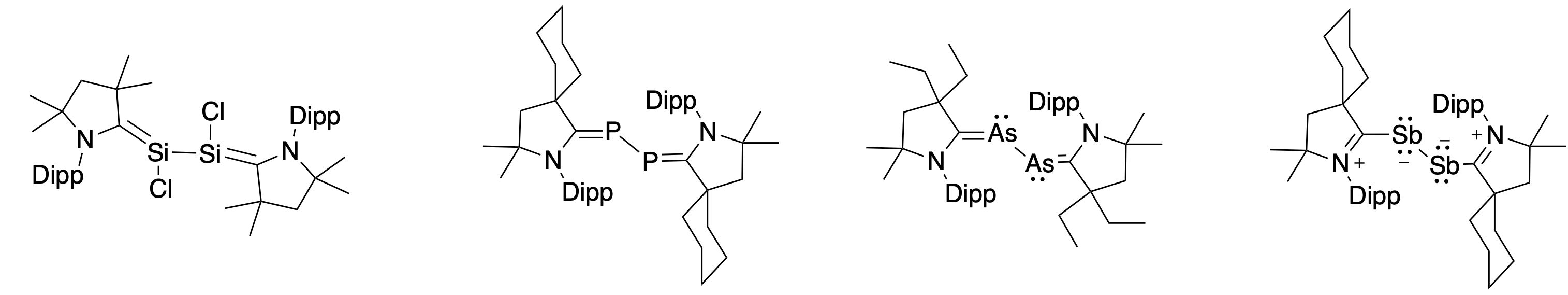
CAAC-stabilized homonuclear bonds of group 14 and 15 elements.

== CAACs in catalysis ==
=== Transition metal catalysis ===
CAAC-supported ruthenium ethenolysis catalysts to produce linear alpha olefins (LAOs) from biomass-derived compounds. This was the first reported instance of olefin metathesis using ethylene gas. These catalysts were extremely active, producing turnover numbers (TON) greater than 100,000 at 1-3 ppm catalyst loading.

Coinage metal CAAC complexes have been well studied. CAAC-Au(I) complexes have been shown to catalyze the production of allynes via cross coupling, hydroamination, hydroamoniumation, and methylamination reactions. CAAC-Cu(I) complexes have been employed in cross-coupling reactions, hydroarylation, and small molecule activation. CAAC-Cu(I)BH_{4} is an efficient catalyst for the reduction of carbon dioxide to formate with a turnover number of 1800, which is a great improvement from other first row transition metal catalysts with TONs typically below 500. CAAC-Cu(I) catalysts have also been used for biologically relevant asymmetric catalysis such as asymmetric conjugate borylation (ACB). Inclusion of a chiral center on the CAAC ligand allows for the production of β-substituted α,β-unsaturated esters with moderate enantioselectivities (up to 55%).

=== Small molecule activation ===
The ambiphilic nature of CAACs gives them properties usually attributed to transition metals, such as the ability to undergo oxidative addition and reductive elimination. The small singlet-triplet gap inherent in CAACs allows for these ligands to activate small molecules and enthalpically strong bonds, including CO, H_{2,} B-H in HBpin, Si-H, P-H, P_{4}, C-H, and N-H in NH_{3.} As a result, CAACs can be implemented as economical metal-free catalysts for a variety of transformations that traditionally needed the aid of transition metal catalysts. Given that many transition metals are scarce and expensive, activation of small molecules using CAACs has important implications for the development of sustainable processes.

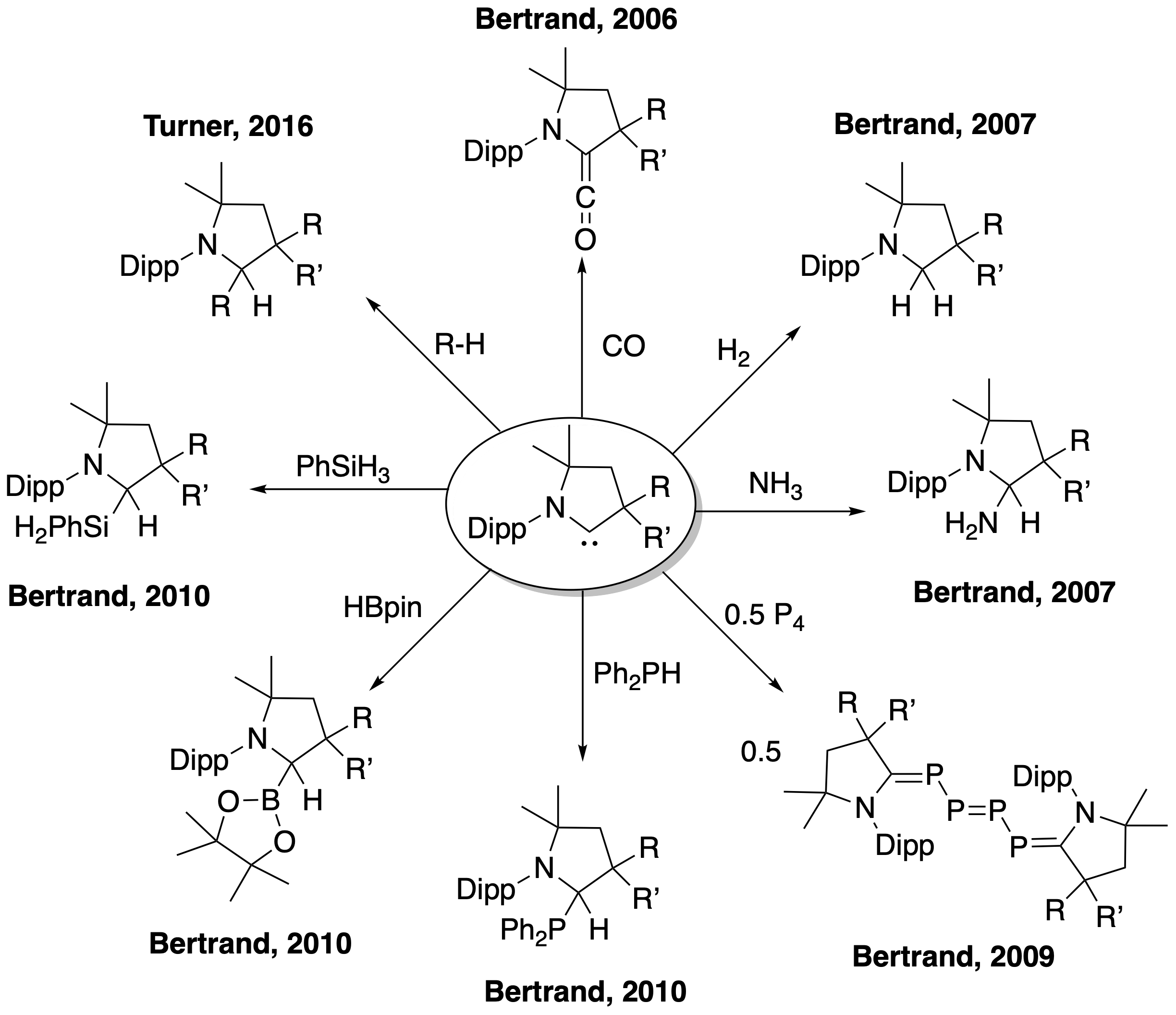
Summary of small molecule activation by CAACs.

=== Photochemistry ===
Copper and gold CAAC complexes exhibit photoluminescence, relevant to organic light emitting diodes (OLEDs). Two coordinate (linear) Cu-CAAC complexes have weaker intermolecular interactions than other OLED candidates, allowing them to reach quantum efficiencies over 99%. Modification of the steric bulk around the carbene center allows for optimization of the excited state lifetimes, where shorter lifetimes are preferred for highest OLED efficiency. CAAC-Cu(I) complexes are also thermally stable up to 270 °C and emit at ambient temperatures, making them good candidates for OLED devices.

=== Single molecule magnets ===
Iron and chromium with CAAC ligands for Single-molecule magnet (SMMs), which exhibit slow magnetic relaxations.
