= Gilda H. Loew =

American chemist

Gilda H. Loew (1930–January 5, 2001) was an American chemist known for applying computational chemistry to biology. She was elected a Fellow of the American Physical Society in 1975.

== Career ==
A native of Brooklyn, New York, Loew attended Erasmus Hall High School and then went on to earn a bachelor's degree from New York University and a master's from Columbia, both in chemistry, before going on to doctoral work at UC Berkeley, where she earned a PhD in chemical physics. In the 1950s and 1960s, she held a number of research positions, at the Lawrence Radiation Laboratory, the Lockheed Missiles and Space Company and the Hansen Laboratories, Stanford University. According to Harel Weinstein and Hugo O. Villar, she became "a pioneer in the application of computational chemistry to problems in the biological sciences". After several years as an associate professor of physics at Pomona College, Loew was appointed as an adjunct professor in the department of genetics at Stanford in 1969, holding this position until 1979, when she established the Molecular Research Institute in Palo Alto, which she led for two decades. She was also an adjunct professor at Rockefeller University between 1978 and 1990.

The research of Loew's that remained critical to those that followed her was the cytochrome P450 protein family and her thirty years of investigation into their characteristics and properties, along with their three dimensional structure and how they interfaced with enzymatic substrates. In doing this research, Loew pioneered using new forms of technology that became available over the years, including numerous advances in computer modeling of proteins. Loew, related to said research, wrote a chapter on the properties of iron porphyrins for the first volume of the textbook series Physical Bioinorganic Chemistry in 1983.

== Legacy ==
The International Society of Quantum Biology and Pharmacology (ISQBP) established the ISQBP Loew Lectureship in her memory in 2004, along with the Gilda Loew Memorial Award after donations were set up by her husband. The following year, the Gilda Loew Memorial Meeting was organized where over 20 speakers presented on topics that were of interest to Loew and her past research.

== Personal life ==
Loew was married to Gregory Loew and had five children and three grandchildren at the time of her death from breast cancer at 70 years old on January 5, 2001.
