= Carbones =

Class of molecules

Generic carbone

Carbones are a class of molecules containing a carbon atom in the ^{1}D excited state with a formal oxidation state of zero where all four valence electrons exist as unbonded lone pairs. These carbon-based compounds are of the formula CL_{2} where L is a strongly σ-donating ligand, typically a phosphine (carbodiphosphoranes) or a N-heterocyclic carbene/NHC (carbodicarbenes), that stabilises the central carbon atom through donor-acceptor bonds. Carbones possess high-energy orbitals with both σ- and π-symmetry, making them strong Lewis bases and strong π-backdonor substituents. Carbones possess high proton affinities and are strong nucleophiles which allows them to function as ligands in a variety of main group and transition metal complexes. Carbone-coordinated elements also exhibit a variety of different reactivities and catalyse various organic and main group reactions.

== Structure and bonding ==
=== Carbodiphosphoranes ===
In the initial syntheses of carbodiphosphoranes, the structure was described as a resonance hybrid between an overall neutral species in which double bonds exists between the central carbon atom and the two complexed phosphorus atoms and a zwitterionic species that places a positive charge on both phosphorus atoms and an overall charge of -2 on the central carbon atom.

Initial proposed carbodiphosphorane resonance structures

However, computational studies on hexaphenylcarbodiphosphorane revealed that the highest-occupied molecular orbitals were both primarily localised on carbon and possessed shapes that were indicative of σ- and π-symmetric lone pairs rather than bonding molecular orbitals. Additional calculations showed σ-bonding orbitals between the central carbon atom and complexed phosphorus atoms but no orbitals localised on phosphorus, indicating the phosphorus atoms were donating their lone pairs into unoccupied valence orbitals on carbon to form a donor-acceptor complex. Crystallographic data also revealed that the hexaphenylcarbodiphosphorane structure was noticeably bent rather than linear with a P-C-P bond angle of 131.7°.

=== Carbodicarbenes ===
The structure of carbodicarbenes greatly resembles that of carbodiphosphoranes. Computational data for a N-methyl-substituted carbodicarbene predicted a carbon-carbon bond with a length only marginally longer than a C=C bond in a typical allene at 1.358 Å (compared with 1.308 Å for allene), but with a significantly bent bond angle of 131.8° (compared to 180° for a standard linear allene). X-ray crystallography confirmed the structure with an experimentally-measured C=C bond length of 1.348 Å and a C-C-C bond angle of 131.8° indicative of two lone pairs present on the central carbon atom. Further calculations revealed the two highest-occupied molecular orbitals to be primarily localised on the central carbon atom as two lone pairs, like with the hexaphenylcarbodiphosphorane, albeit with slightly more delocalisation of the π-symmetric orbital onto the N-heterocyclic carbene carbon atoms due to their improved π-accepting properties. This is suggestive of a donor-acceptor interaction between the N-heterocyclic carbene ligands and a formally carbon (0) atom with two free lone pairs.

=== Other carbene structures ===
Phosphaketene ylides (general formula R_{3}P=C=C=O) and carbon suboxide (O=C=C=C=O) have also exhibited carbone-like character where a carbon (0) species participates in a donor-acceptor interaction with carbon monoxide. The crystal structure of triphenylphosphoranylideneketene (Ph_{3}PC_{2}O) revealed a P-C-C bond angle of 145.5° consistent with the bent structure of other carbon (0) compounds. While both computational and solid-state experimental data indicated a linear structure for carbon suboxide, the same models predicted only an energy difference of 1.9 kcal mol^{−1} (7.9 kJ mol^{−1}) between linear carbon suboxide and bent (137°) carbon suboxide. Other high-level coupled cluster calculations and gas-phase experimental studies even indicate a very shallow double well potential with a depth comparable to the vibrational zero point energy, resulting a 'quasilinear' geometry. The ease of bending and relatively large contribution of carbon in the two highest-occupied molecular orbitals imply a certain degree of carbone-like character.

== Synthesis ==
=== Carbodiphosphoranes ===
One strategy for the synthesis of carbodiphosphoranes involves the use of a reducing agent on a carbon reagent in its +2 or +4 oxidation state. The first successful synthesis of a compound now recognised as a carbodiphosphorane was achieved by Ramirez et al. in 1961 with this method. By stirring methylidebis-(triphenylphosphonium) bromide with potassium metal suspended in a diglyme solution, the potassium reduced the starting material to form hexaphenylcarbodiphosphorane as a stable, yellow, crystalline solid.

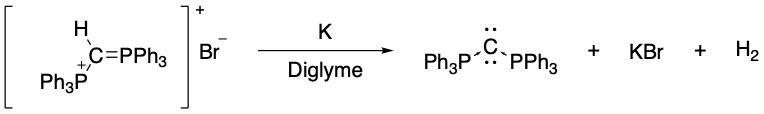
First carbodiphosphorane synthesis

Alternative methods to synthesise alkyl-substituted carbodiphosphoranes involve the deprotonation or elimination of carbon (IV) or carbon (II) starting materials. Reacting a carbon (IV) or carbon (II) diphosphine salt with a strong base such as sodium hydride or sodium amide can deprotonate the centre carbon atom to form the desired carbodiphosphorane. Alternatively, a halide-substituted phosphonium salt can undergo an elimination reaction in the presence of a strong base to form a carbodiphosphorane.

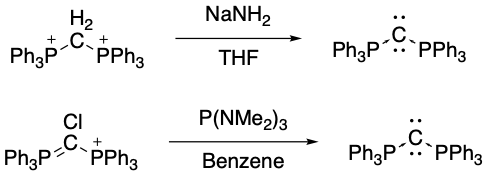
Alternative syntheses of alkyl-carbodiphosphoranes

Synthetic methods have also been developed for more diverse carbodiphosphoranes. Methylenediphosphines will undergo a reaction with hexafluoroacetone or thioacetone to form O-substituted and S-substituted carbodiphosphoranes respectively. Cyclic carbodiphosphoranes have also been successfully synthesised through the reaction of bis(diisopropylamino)phosphino diazomethane with bis(dialkylamino)phosphenium triflate in excess benzonitrile followed by deprotonation with hexamethyldisilazide.

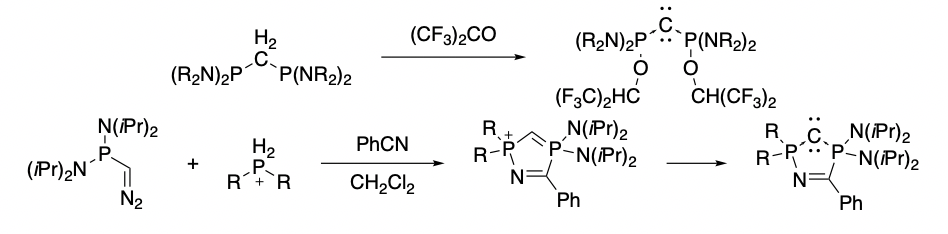
Synthesis of more diverse carbodiphosphoranes

=== Carbodicarbenes ===
The first carbodicarbene synthesis was achieved much later than the first carbodiphosphorane synthesis, in 2008 by Dyker et al. The first step was the methylation of bis(N-methylbenzimidazol-2-yl)methane using methyl triflate and the second step was the deprotonation of the carbon (II) species using potassium bis(trimethylsilyl)amide (KHMDS) to yield the desired N-heterocyclic-carbene-substituted carbone.

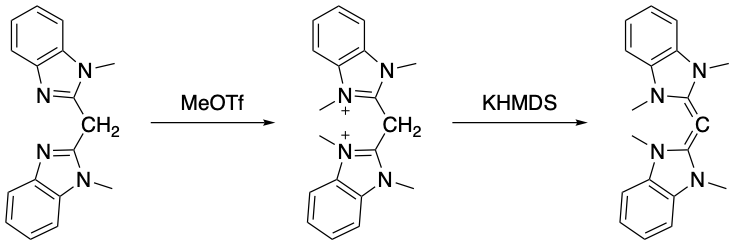
First carbodicarbene synthesis

Similar non-cyclic carbodicarbenes have also been successfully synthesised from iminium salts through the condensation of two equivalents of the starting material in dimethylacetamide (DMA), followed by nucleophilic substitution with dimethylamine, then deprotonation with n-butyllithium to form a tetraaminoallene which acts as a carbodicarbene. Additionally, a method of facile synthesis of asymmetric carbodicarbenes was developed by Chen et al. in 2015 by using a simple nucleophilic substitution reaction. Reacting an olefin substituted with a N-heterocyclic carbene scaffold with a thioether containing a different NHC moiety generates a product which can be readily deprotonated to afford a carbodicarbene with two different carbene substituents with improved functionality.

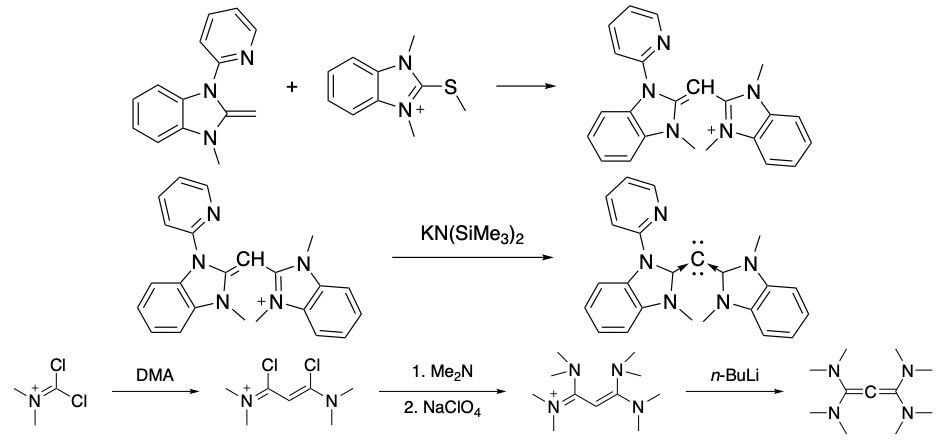
Alternative carbodicarbene syntheses

== Reactivity ==
=== Basicity ===
The presence of two lone pairs on the central carbon atom make it possible for carbones to act as Brønsted-Lowry bases and accept two protons from an acid. The typical first proton affinity for a carbodiphosphorane ranges from 209.3 kcal mol^{−1} (875.7 kJ mol^{−1}) for the weakest base to 287.6 kcal mol^{−1} (1203 kJ mol^{−1}) for the strongest base and second proton affinities ranging from 70.6 kcal mol^{−1} (295 kJ mol^{−1}) to 188.9 kcal mol^{−1} (790.4 kJ mol^{−1}). For comparison, the proton affinity of potassium hydroxide is 1101.8 kJ mol^{−1}, indicating that carbodiphosphoranes can function as strong bases. Carbodicarbenes can act as even stronger bases than carbodiphosphoranes with first proton affinities reaching as high as 294.3 kcal mol^{−1} (1231 kJ mol^{−1}). However, the second proton affinities for carbodicarbenes are comparable to those of carbodiphosphoranes and exhibit variability depending on the identity of the N-heterocyclic carbene substituent with a range of values from 155.3 kcal mol^{−1} (649.8 kJ mol^{−1}) to 168.4 kcal mol^{−1} (704.6 kJ mol^{−1}). This is due to the increased delocalisation of the π-symmetric lone pair over the carbon atoms of the N-heterocyclic carbene substituents which increases the dependence of the second proton affinity on the identity of the substituent.

=== Ligands ===
In addition to being strong Brønsted-Lowry bases, carbones are also nucleophilic and act as strong Lewis bases when coordinating with transition metals and main group elements. Several computational studies found that carbodiphosphoranes bound tightly to tungsten and nickel with metal-ligand bond dissociation energies that were greater than those of carbon monoxide metal-ligand bonds for certain compounds. Experimentally, a variety of metal-carbodiphosphorane complexes have been synthesised and characterised, including with metals such as tungsten, nickel, copper, silver, and gold. The gold complex is of particular note as it is the first geminal digold complex and provides experimental evidence supporting the structure of carbodiphosphoranes as a carbon (0) compound with two lone pairs on the central carbon atom donating to the gold atoms.

Gem-Digold complex synthesised from hexaphenylcarbodiphosphorane

Carbodicarbenes have also been shown to form complexes with different transition metals such as rhodium and gold. In the former experiment, when a rhodium carbonyl complex was coordinated to a carbodicarbene, the carbon-oxygen stretching frequency was observed at 2014 cm^{−1} which is significantly lower than the same carbon-oxygen stretching frequency when rhodium is coordinated to a N-heterocyclic carbene (between 2058 cm^{−1} and 2036 cm^{−1}) which is indicative of a strong π-donating effect from the second carbon lone-pair of the carbone.

=== Reactivity in transition metal complexes ===
Transition metal complexes containing a carbone ligand also exhibit a wide range of reactivity. In 2015, Pranckevicius et al. synthesised a ruthenium (II) catalyst coordinated to two different carbodicarbene ligands that was able to catalytically reduce olefins with excellent diastereoselectivity and similar activity to Crabtree’s catalyst. Palladium(II) catalysts with bis(pyridine)carbodicarbene ligands have been shown to be successful catalysts for Suzuki-Miyaura and Heck-Mizoroki coupling reactions while rhodium (I) catalysts coordinated to carbodicarbene pincer ligands have been shown to hydroaminate and hydroarylate dienes.

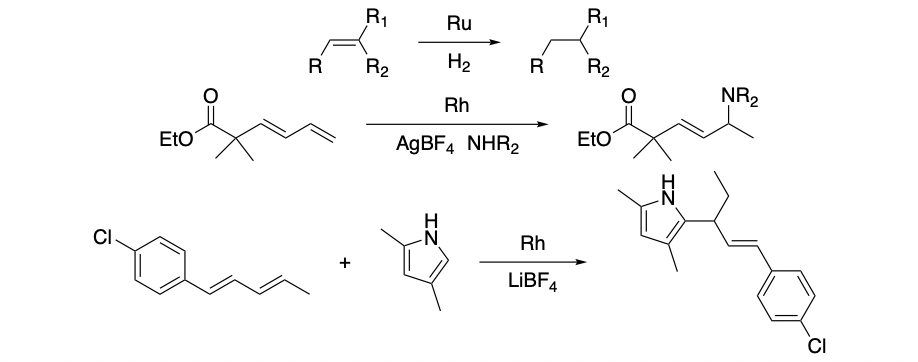
Sample transition-metal catalysed reactions where the catalyst contains a carbone ligand

=== Reactivity in main group complexes ===
Carbones can also form complexes with main group elements. The strong σ- and π-donating properties of carbones have made them optimal tools for stabilising reactive main-group-based species. Carbodicarbenes have been employed in the successful synthesis of novel boron-containing compounds such as borenium ions, which can exhibit useful optical properties, as well as a dicationic tricoordinate hydridoboron compound. Carbones have also been used in the first synthesis of stable carbon-bismuth species with π-bonding character. Carbodicarbenes have also seen significant utility in the field of beryllium chemistry with the synthesis of a five-membered beryllacycle through C-H activation as well as beryllacycle ring expansion.

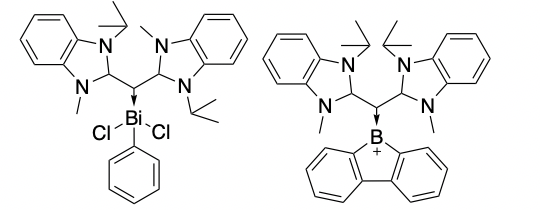
Examples of main group complexes stabilised by carbodicarbenes
