= Hexaphenylcarbodiphosphorane =

Organophosphorus compound

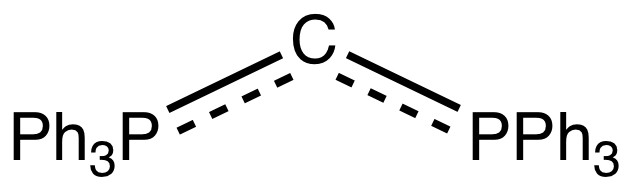

Names
- Preferred IUPAC name Methanediylidenebis(triphenyl-λ^{5}-phosphane)
- Other names bis(triphenylphosphoranylidene)methane

Identifiers
CAS Number	7533-52-0
3D model (JSmol)	Interactive image
ChemSpider	9333895
PubChem CID	11158793
- InChI: InChI=1S/C37H30P2/c1-7-19-32(20-8-1)38(33-21-9-2-10-22-33,34-23-11-3-12-24-34)31-39(35-25-13-4-14-26-35,36-27-15-5-16-28-36)37-29-17-6-18-30-37/h1-30H Key: KGZNGAKXXXNCGK-UHFFFAOYSA-N
- SMILES: C1=CC=C(C=C1)P(=C=P(C2=CC=CC=C2)(C3=CC=CC=C3)C4=CC=CC=C4)(C5=CC=CC=C5)C6=CC=CC=C6

Properties
Chemical formula	C_{37}H_{30}P_{2}
Molar mass	536.595 g·mol^{−1}
Appearance	yellow solid
Density	1.205 g/cm^{3}
Melting point	198–201 °C (388–394 °F; 471–474 K)
- Except where otherwise noted, data are given for materials in their standard state (at 25 °C [77 °F], 100 kPa). Infobox references

Hexaphenylcarbodiphosphorane is the organophosphorus compound with the formula C(PPh_{3})_{2} (where Ph = C_{6}H_{5}). It is a yellow, moisture-sensitive solid. The compound is classified as an ylide and as such carries significant negative charge on carbon. It is isoelectronic with bis(triphenylphosphine)iminium. The P-C-P angle is 131°. The compound has attracted attention as an unusual ligand in organometallic chemistry.

The pure compound has two crystalline phases: a metastable monoclinic C2 phase that is triboluminescent, and an orthorhombic P222 form that is not. Both polymorphs are photoluminescent, with respective peak wavelengths at 540 and 575 nm.

== Preparation ==
The compound was originally prepared by deprotonation of the phosphonium salt [HC(PPh_{3})_{2}]Br using potassium.

An improved procedure entails production of the same double phosphonium salt from methylene bromide. The double deprotonation is effected with potassium amide.

== Related compounds ==
- Methylenetriphenylphosphorane (CH_{2}=PPh_{3}), the parent Wittig reagent
