= Benzil reductase =

Benzil reductase may refer to:

- Benzil reductase ((R)-benzoin forming)
- Benzil reductase ((S)-benzoin forming)
