= Thiazole =

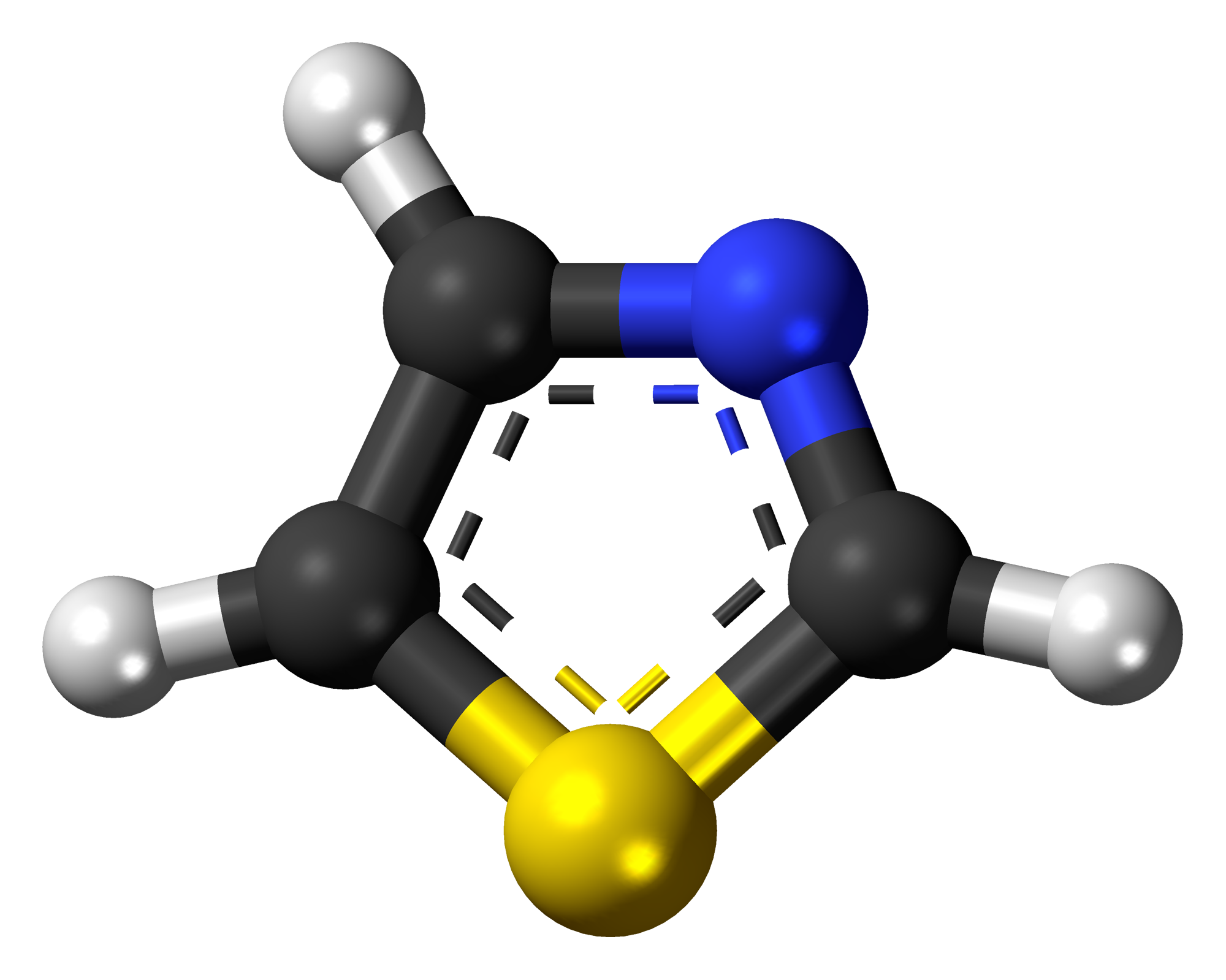

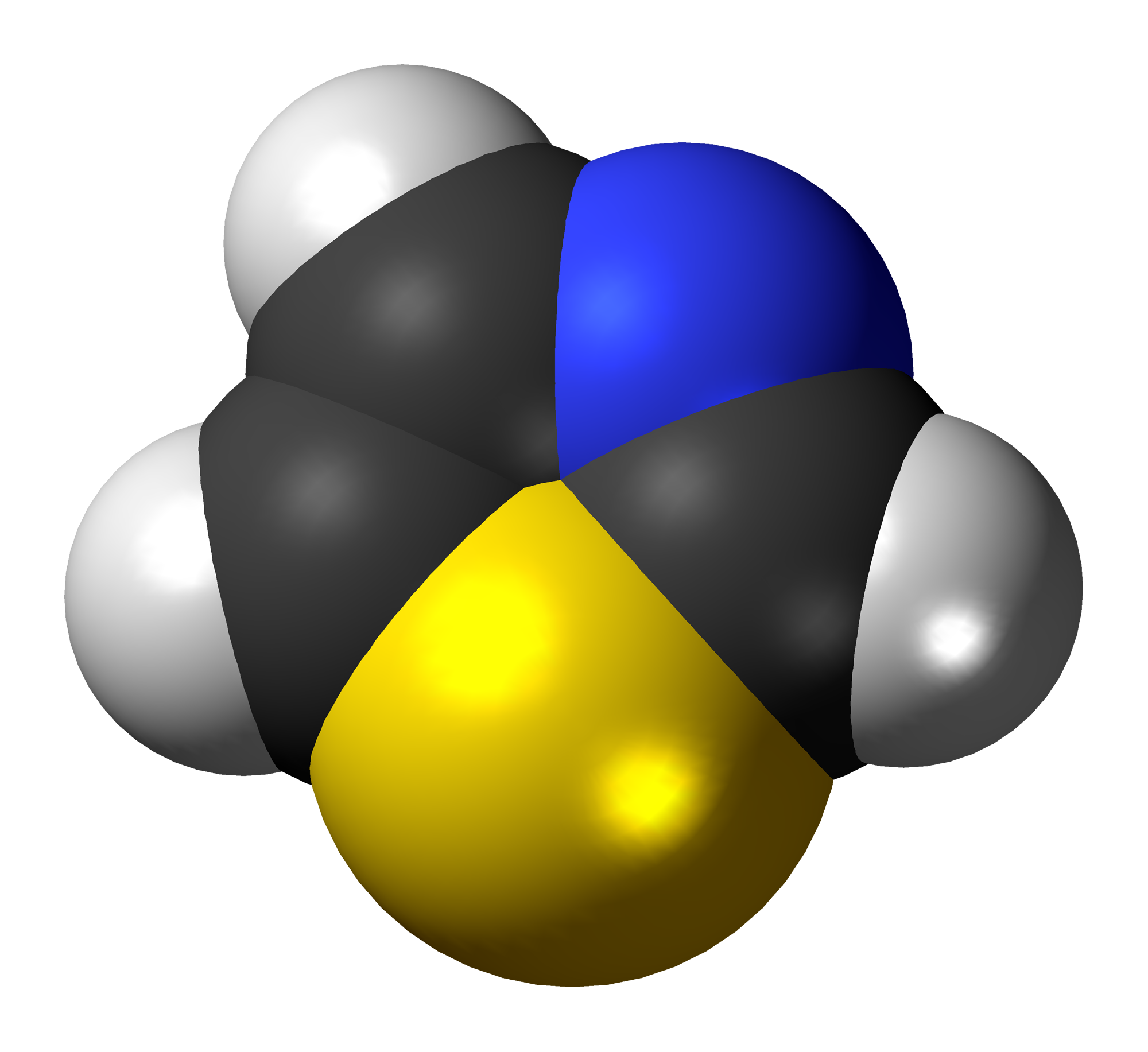

Names
- Preferred IUPAC name 1,3-Thiazole
- Other names Thiazole

Identifiers
CAS Number	288-47-1
3D model (JSmol)	Interactive image
ChEBI	CHEBI:43732
ChEMBL	ChEMBL15605
ChemSpider	8899
ECHA InfoCard	100.005.475
PubChem CID	9256
UNII	320RCW8PEF
CompTox Dashboard (EPA)	DTXSID2059776
- InChI: InChI=1S/C3H3NS/c1-2-5-3-4-1/h1-3H Key: FZWLAAWBMGSTSO-UHFFFAOYSA-N; InChI=1/C3H3NS/c1-2-5-3-4-1/h1-3H Key: FZWLAAWBMGSTSO-UHFFFAOYAI
- SMILES: n1ccsc1

Properties
Chemical formula	C_{3}H_{3}NS
Molar mass	85.12 g·mol^{−1}
Boiling point	116 to 118 °C (241 to 244 °F; 389 to 391 K)
Acidity (pK_{a})	2.5 (of conjugate acid)
Magnetic susceptibility (χ)	−50.55·10^{−6} cm^{3}/mol
- Except where otherwise noted, data are given for materials in their standard state (at 25 °C [77 °F], 100 kPa). verify (what is ?) Infobox references

Thiazole (/ˈθaɪ.əzoʊl/), or 1,3-thiazole, is a 5-membered heterocyclic compound that contains both sulfur and nitrogen. The term 'thiazole' also refers to a large family of derivatives. Thiazole itself is a pale yellow liquid with a pyridine-like odor and the molecular formula C_{3}H_{3}NS. The thiazole ring is notable as a component of the vitamin thiamine (B_{1}).

== Molecular and electronic structure ==
Thiazoles are members of the azoles, heterocycles that include imidazoles and oxazoles. Thiazole can also be considered a functional group when part of a larger molecule.

Being planar, thiazoles are characterized by significant π electron delocalization and exhibit a degree of aromaticity greater than that of corresponding oxazoles. This aromaticity is evidenced by the ^{1}H NMR chemical shift of the ring protons, which display resonances between 7.27 and 8.77 ppm, indicating a strong diamagnetic ring current. The calculated electron density marks C5 as the primary site for electrophilic substitution, and C2-H as susceptible to deprotonation.

== Occurrence of thiazoles and thiazolium salts ==
Bleomycin is a thiazole-containing anti-cancer drug.

Thiazoles are found in a variety of specialized products, often fused with benzene derivatives, the so-called benzothiazoles. In addition to vitamin B_{1}, the thiazole ring is found in epothilone. Other important thiazole derivatives are benzothiazoles, for example, the firefly chemical luciferin. Whereas thiazoles are well represented in biomolecules, oxazoles are not. It is found in naturally occurring peptides, and utilised in the development of peptidomimetics (i.e. molecules that mimic the function and structure of peptides).

Commercial significant thiazoles include mainly dyes and fungicides. Thifluzamide, Tricyclazole, and Thiabendazole are marketed for control of various agricultural pests. Another widely used thiazole derivative is the non-steroidal anti-inflammatory drug Meloxicam. The following anthroquinone dyes contain benzothiazole subunits: Algol Yellow 8 (CAS# [6451-12-3]), Algol Yellow GC (CAS# [129-09-9]), Indanthren Rubine B (CAS# [6371-49-9]), Indanthren Blue CLG (CAS# [6371-50-2], and Indanthren Blue CLB (CAS#[6492-78-0]). These thiazole dye are used for dyeing cotton.

== Synthesis ==
Various laboratory methods exist for the organic synthesis of thiazoles. Prominent is the Hantzsch thiazole synthesis, which is a reaction between haloketones and thioamides. For example, 2,4-dimethylthiazole is synthesized from thioacetamide and chloroacetone. In the Cook-Heilbron synthesis, thiazoles arise by the condensation of α-aminonitrile with carbon disulfide. Thiazoles can be accessed by acylation of 2-aminothiolates, often available by the Herz reaction.

=== Biosynthesis ===
Thiazoles are generally formed via reactions of cysteine, which provides the N-C-C-S backbone of the ring. Thiamine does not fit this pattern however. Several biosynthesis routes lead to the thiazole ring as required for the formation of thiamine. Sulfur of the thiazole is derived from cysteine. In anaerobic bacteria, the CN group is derived from dehydroglycine.

== Reactions ==
With a pK_{a} of 2.5 for the conjugate acid, thiazoles are far less basic than imidazole (pK_{a} =7).

Deprotonation with strong bases (e.g. Hauser bases and organolithium compounds) occurs at C2-H. The negative charge on this position is stabilized as an ylide. 2-Lithiothiazoles are also generated by metal-halogen exchange from 2-bromothiazole.

Electrophilic aromatic substitution occurs at C5 but requires activating groups such as a methyl:

Thiazole bromination

Nucleophilic substitution requires no additional activation:

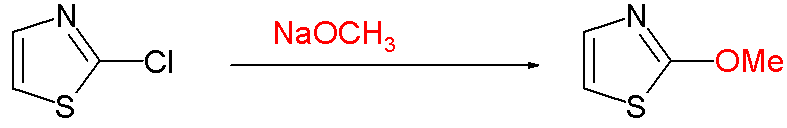
Thiazole Nucleophilic Aromatic Substitution

Nitrogen oxidation gives the aromatic thiazole N-oxide. Many oxidizing agents, such as mCPBA or hypofluorous acid, suffice; but some of the oxidation takes place at sulfur, leading to a non-aromatic sulfoxide/sulfone:

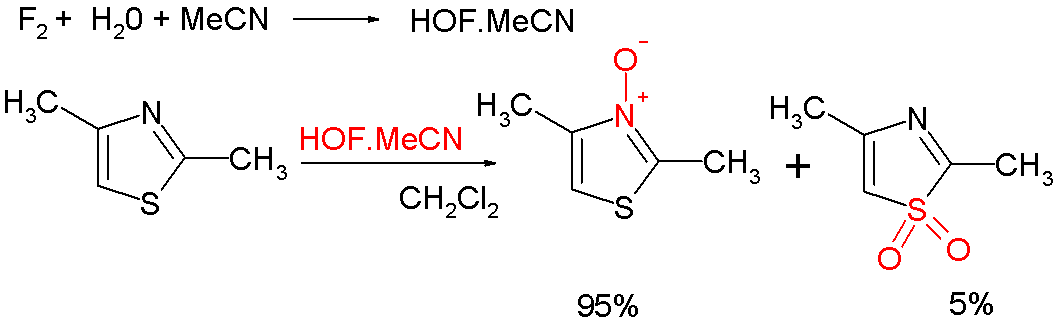
Thiazole oxidation

In palladium-catalysed C-H arylations, the N-oxide shifts the reactivity to reliably favor the 2-position, and allows for much more mild reaction conditions.

Thiazoles can react in cycloadditions, but in general at high temperatures due to favorable aromatic stabilization of the reactant. Diels-Alder reactions with alkynes precede sulfur extrusion, and the end product is a pyridine. One study examined the reaction mechanism between 2-(dimethylamino)thiazole and dimethyl acetylenedicarboxylate (DMAD) to a pyridine. The first intermediate, a zwitterion, appeared in a formal [2+2]cycloaddition to a cyclobutene. It then underwent a 4-electron electrocyclic ring opening to a 1,3-thiazepine and then a 6-electron electrocyclic ring closing to a 7-thia-2-azanorcaradiene. Finally, it extruded the sulfur atom:

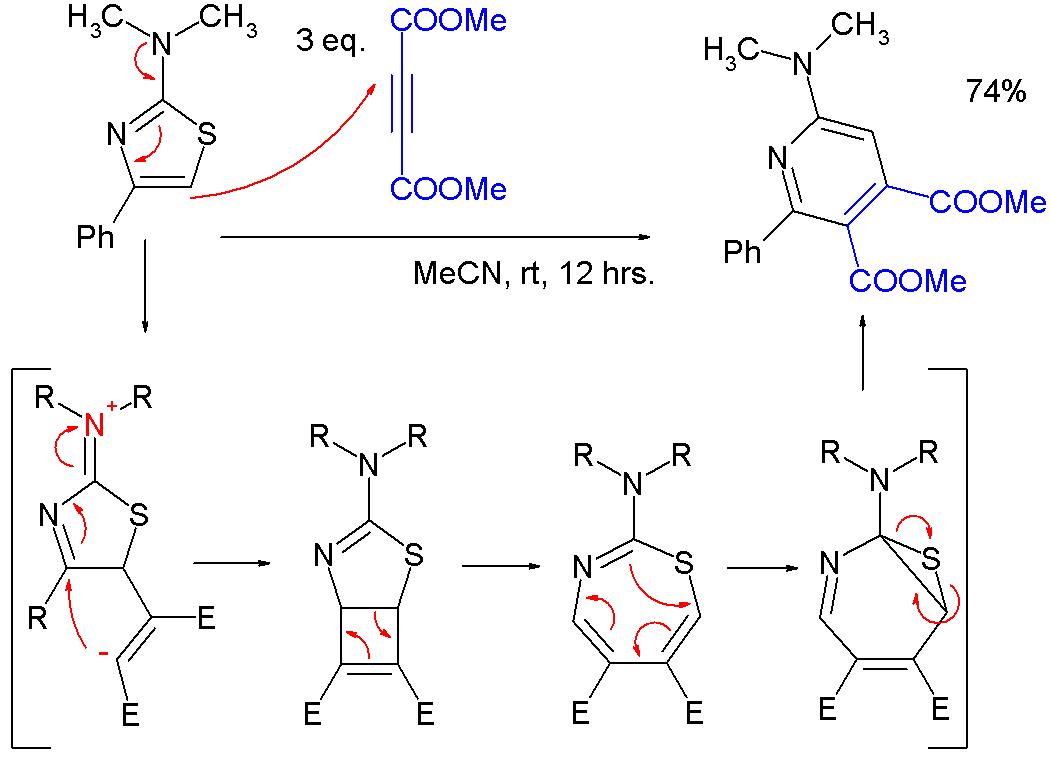
Thiazole cycloaddition

Thiazoles are formyl synthons, but conversion of a thiazole to an aldehyde (R-Ar to R-COH) requires multiple steps: N-methylation with methyl iodide, organic reduction with sodium borohydride, and finally hydrolysis with mercury(II) chloride in water.

=== Thiazolium salts ===
Alkylation of thiazoles at nitrogen forms a thiazolium cation. Thiazolium salts are catalysts in the Stetter reaction and the Benzoin condensation. Deprotonation of N-alkyl thiazolium salts give the free carbenes and transition metal carbene complexes.

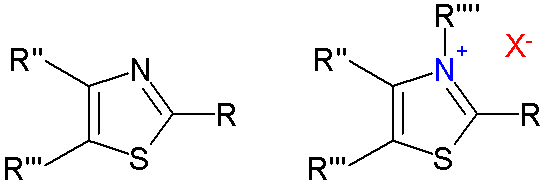
Structure of thiazoles (left) and thiazolium salts (right)

Alagebrium is a thiazolium-based drug.
