= Benzil reductase ((S)-benzoin forming) =

Identifiers
- EC no.: 1.1.1.320

Databases
- IntEnz: IntEnz view
- BRENDA: BRENDA entry
- ExPASy: NiceZyme view
- KEGG: KEGG entry
- MetaCyc: metabolic pathway
- PRIAM: profile
- PDB structures: RCSB PDB PDBe PDBsum
Search
- PMC: articles
- PubMed: articles
- NCBI: proteins

Benzil reductase ((S)-benzoin forming) (EC 1.1.1.320, YueD) is an enzyme with systematic name (S)-benzoin:NADP^{+} oxidoreductase. This enzyme catalyses the following chemical reaction:

(S)-benzoin
+ NADP^{+}
H^{+}
H^{+}
benzil
+ NADPH

The enzyme also reduces 1-phenylpropane-1,2-dione.
