= Benzil reductase ((R)-benzoin forming) =

Identifiers
- EC no.: 1.1.1.321

Databases
- IntEnz: IntEnz view
- BRENDA: BRENDA entry
- ExPASy: NiceZyme view
- KEGG: KEGG entry
- MetaCyc: metabolic pathway
- PRIAM: profile
- PDB structures: RCSB PDB PDBe PDBsum
Search
- PMC: articles
- PubMed: articles
- NCBI: proteins

Benzil reductase ((R)-benzoin forming) (EC 1.1.1.321) is an enzyme with systematic name (R)-benzoin:NADP^{+} oxidoreductase. This enzyme catalyses the following chemical reaction:

(R)-benzoin
+ NADP^{+}
H^{+}
H^{+}
benzil
+ NADPH

The bacterial enzyme (Xanthomonas oryzae) enantioselectively reduces one of the two carbonyl groups of benzil to form optically active (R)-benzoin.
