= Cook–Heilbron thiazole synthesis =

Chemical synthesis

Cook-Heilbron thiazole synthesis
Named after	Alan H. Cook; Ian Heilbron
Reaction type	Ring forming reaction

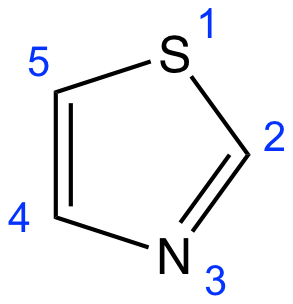
Priority system of numbering thiazole positions.

The Cook–Heilbron thiazole synthesis highlights the formation of 5-aminothiazoles through the chemical reaction of α-aminonitriles or aminocyanoacetates with dithioacids, carbon disulphide, carbon oxysulfide, or isothiocyanates at room temperature and under mild or aqueous conditions. Variation of substituents at the 2nd and 4th position of the thiazole is introduced by selecting different combinations of starting reagents.

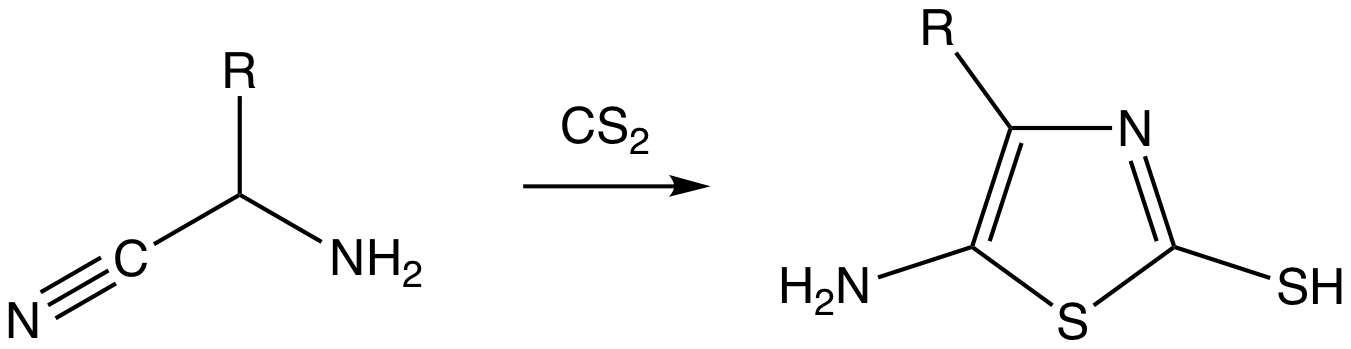

This reaction was first discovered in 1947 by Alan H. Cook, Sir Ian Heilbron, and A.L Levy, and marks one of the first examples of 5-aminothiazole synthesis with significant yield and diversity in scope. Prior to their discovery, 5-aminothiazoles were a relatively unknown class of compounds, but were of synthetic interest and utility. Their premier publication illustrated the formation of 5-amino-2-benzylthiazole and 5-amino-4-carbethoxy-2-benzylthiazole by reacting dithiophenylacetic acid with aminoacetonitrile and ethyl aminocyanoacetate, respectively. Subsequent experiments by Cook and Heilbron, detailed in their series of publications titled “Studies in the Azole Series” describe early attempts to expand the scope of 5-aminothiazole synthesis, as well as employ 5-aminothiazoles in the formation of purines and pyridines.

== Mechanism ==
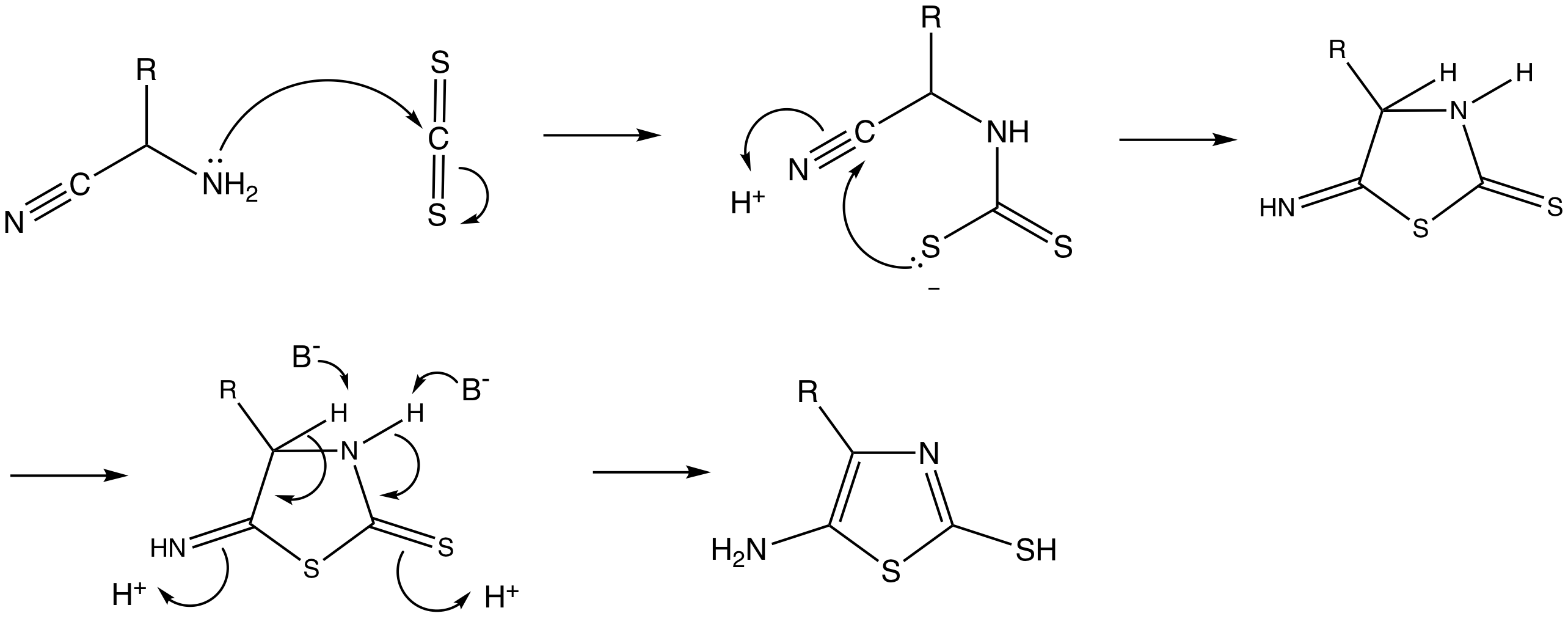
The mechanism for the Cook-Heilbron synthesis of a 5-aminothiazole starting from an a-aminonitrile and carbon disulphide. An adaptation of the mechanism proposed in Li, J. (2004). Name Reactions A Collection of Detailed Mechanisms and Synthetic Applications.

In the first step of the reaction mechanism for the synthesis of a 5-aminothiazole from an α-aminonitrile and carbon disulphide, a lone pair on the nitrogen of the α-aminonitrile performs a nucleophilic attack on the slightly electropositive carbon of carbon disulfide. This addition reaction pushes electrons from the carbon-sulfur double bond onto one of the sulfur atoms. Acting as a Lewis Base, the sulfur atom donates its electrons to the carbon atom of the nitrile, forming a sulfur-carbon sigma bond in an intramolecular 5-exo-dig cyclization. This cyclization forms a 5-imino-2-thione thiazolidine compound that undergoes a tautomerization when a base, such as water, abstracts the hydrogens at positions 3 and 4. The electrons from the carbon-hydrogen sigma bond are pushed back into the thiazole ring, forming two new double bonds with the adjacent carbon atoms, and catalyzing the formation of two new nitrogen-hydrogen, and sulfur-hydrogen sigma bonds. This tautomerization occurs because it is thermodynamically favourable, yielding the aromatic final product: 5-aminothiazole.

== Applications ==
Few instances of applications of the Cook–Heilbron thiazole synthesis are found in literature. In recent years, modifications of the Hantzsch thiazole synthesis are the most common, partly because of its ease in introducing R- group diversity.

However, in 2008 Scott et al. employed a Cook-Heilbron synthesis in their approach to synthesize novel of pyridyl and thiazolyl bisamide CSF-1R inhibitors for use in novel cancer therapeutics. A couple of the compounds that were analysed for in vivo anti-cancer activity contained thiazole derivatives that had been synthesized using a Cook-Heilbron approach. For instance, 2-methyl-5-aminothiazoles were prepared via condensation and cyclization of aminoacetonitrile and ethyldithioacetate as part of the synthesis of thiazolyl bisamines:

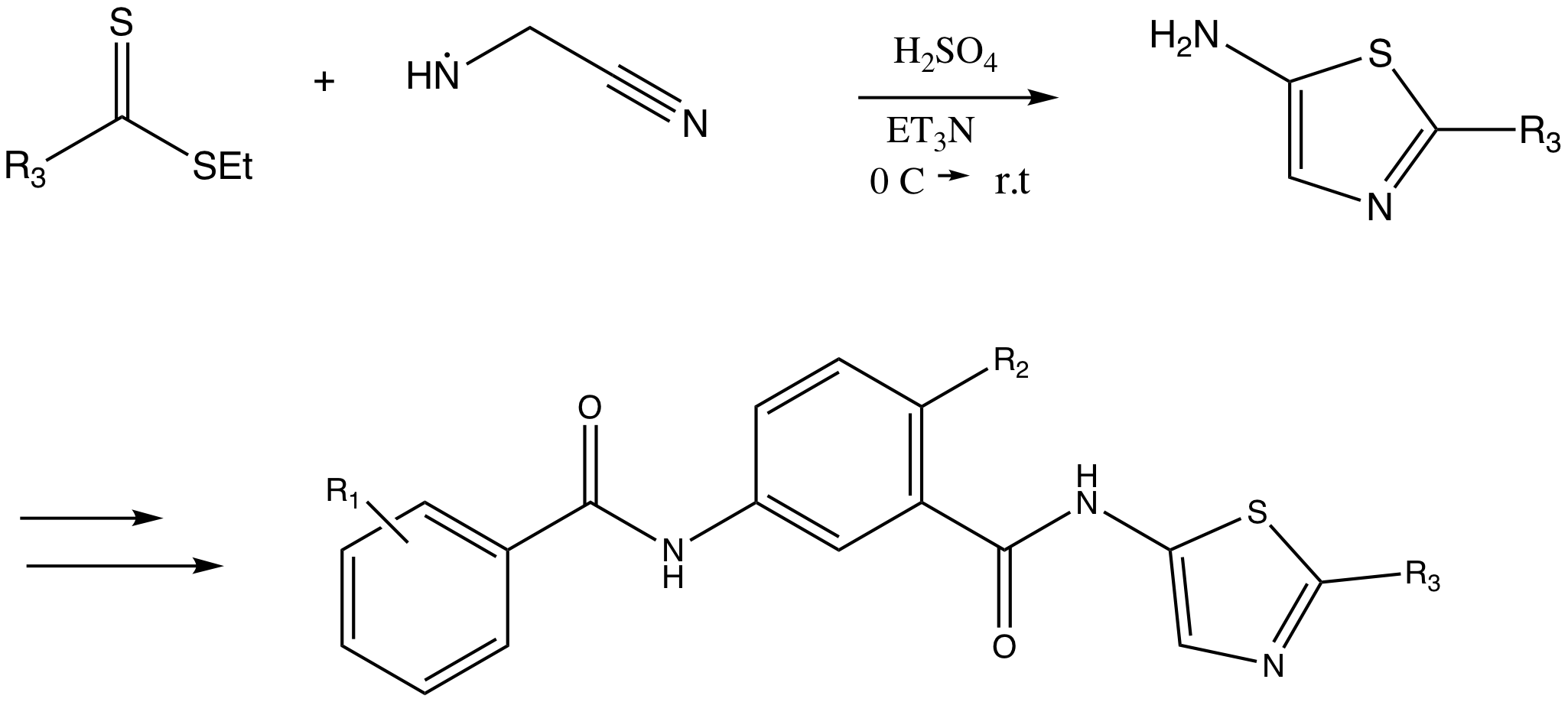
An example of an application of the Cook-Heilbron thiazole synthesis. Illustrates the synthesis of 2-methyl-5-aminothiazoles were prepared via condensation and cyclization of aminoacetonitrile and ethyldithioacetate as part of an approach to synthesize pyridyl and thiazoyl bisamide CSF-1R inhibitors for use in novel cancer therapeutics. Adapted from study by 12. Scott et al. (2008). Pyridyl and thiazolyl bisamide CSF-1R inhibitors for the treatment of cancer. Bioorganic & Medicinal Chemistry Letters, 18(17), pp.4794-4797.

== Relevance ==
Thiazoles are essential components of many biologically active compounds making them important features in drug design. Thiazoles are found in a number of pharmacological compounds such as tiazofurin and dasatinib (antineoplastic agents), ritonavir (an anti-HIV drug), ravuconazole (antifungal agent), meloxicam and fentiazac (anti-inflammatory agents) and nizatidine (anti-ulcer agent).

Consequently, understanding and applying a range of approaches to synthesize thiazoles facilitates greater flexibility in both designing drugs as well as optimizing synthetic routes.
