= Benzoin condensation =

Reaction between two aromatic aldehydes

In organic chemistry, the benzoin addition is an addition reaction involving two aldehydes (−CH=O). The reaction generally occurs between aromatic aldehydes or glyoxals (OCH=CHO), and results in formation of an acyloin (−C(O)CH(OH)−). In the classic example, benzaldehyde is converted to benzoin (PhCH(OH)C(O)Ph).

The benzoin condensation was first reported in 1832 by Justus von Liebig and Friedrich Wöhler during their research on bitter almond oil. The catalytic version of the reaction involving cyanide was developed by Nikolay Zinin in the late 1830s.

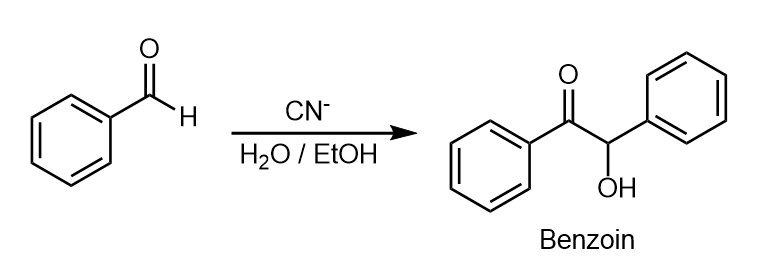
Benzoin addition

== Reaction mechanism ==
The reaction is catalyzed by nucleophiles such as a cyanide or an N-heterocyclic carbene (often vitamin B1 derivatives). The reaction mechanism was proposed in 1903 by A. J. Lapworth. In the first step in this reaction, the cyanide anion (as sodium cyanide) reacts with the aldehyde in a nucleophilic addition. Rearrangement of the intermediate results in polarity reversal of the carbonyl group, which then adds to the second carbonyl group in a second nucleophilic addition. Proton transfer and elimination of the cyanide ion affords benzoin as the product. This is a reversible reaction, which means that the distribution of products is determined by the relative thermodynamic stability of the products and starting material.

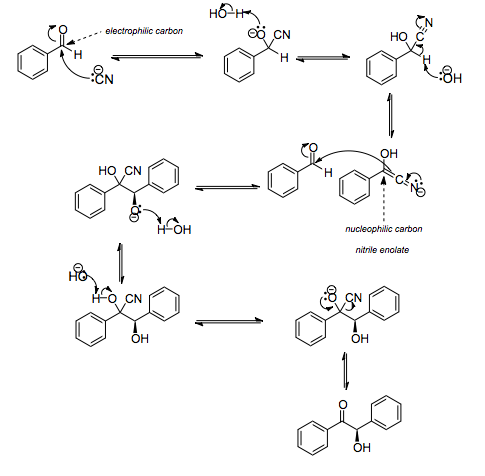
Mechanism of the benzoin addition

In this reaction, one aldehyde donates a proton and one aldehyde accepts a proton. Some aldehydes can only donate protons, such as 4-dimethylaminobenzaldehyde, whereas benzaldehyde is both a proton acceptor and donor. In this way it is possible to synthesise mixed benzoins, i.e. products with different groups on each half of the product. However, care should be taken to match a proton donating aldehyde with a proton accepting aldehyde to avoid undesired homo-dimerization.

== Scope ==
The reaction can be extended to aliphatic aldehydes with base catalysis in the presence of thiazolium salts; the reaction mechanism is essentially the same. These compounds are important in the synthesis of heterocyclic compounds. The analogous 1,4-addition of an aldehyde to an enone is called the Stetter reaction.

In biochemistry, the coenzyme thiamine is responsible for biosynthesis of acyloin-like compounds utilizing the benzoin addition. This coenzyme also contains a thiazolium moiety, which on deprotonation becomes a nucleophilic carbene.

The asymmetric version of this reaction has been performed by utilizing chiral thiazolium and triazolium salts. Triazolium salts were found to give greater enantiomeric excess than thiazolium salts. An example is shown below.

Scheme 2. An intramolecular benzoin addition

Since the products of the reaction are thermodynamically controlled, the retro benzoin addition can be synthetically useful. If a benzoin or acyloin can be synthesized by another method, then they can be converted into the component ketones using cyanide or thiazolium catalysts. The reaction mechanism is the same as above, but it occurs in the reverse direction. This can allow the access of ketones otherwise difficult to produce.

== See also ==
- Aldol addition
- Acyloin condensation
- Cannizzaro reaction
- Stetter reaction
- Umpolung
