= Benzoin (organic compound) =

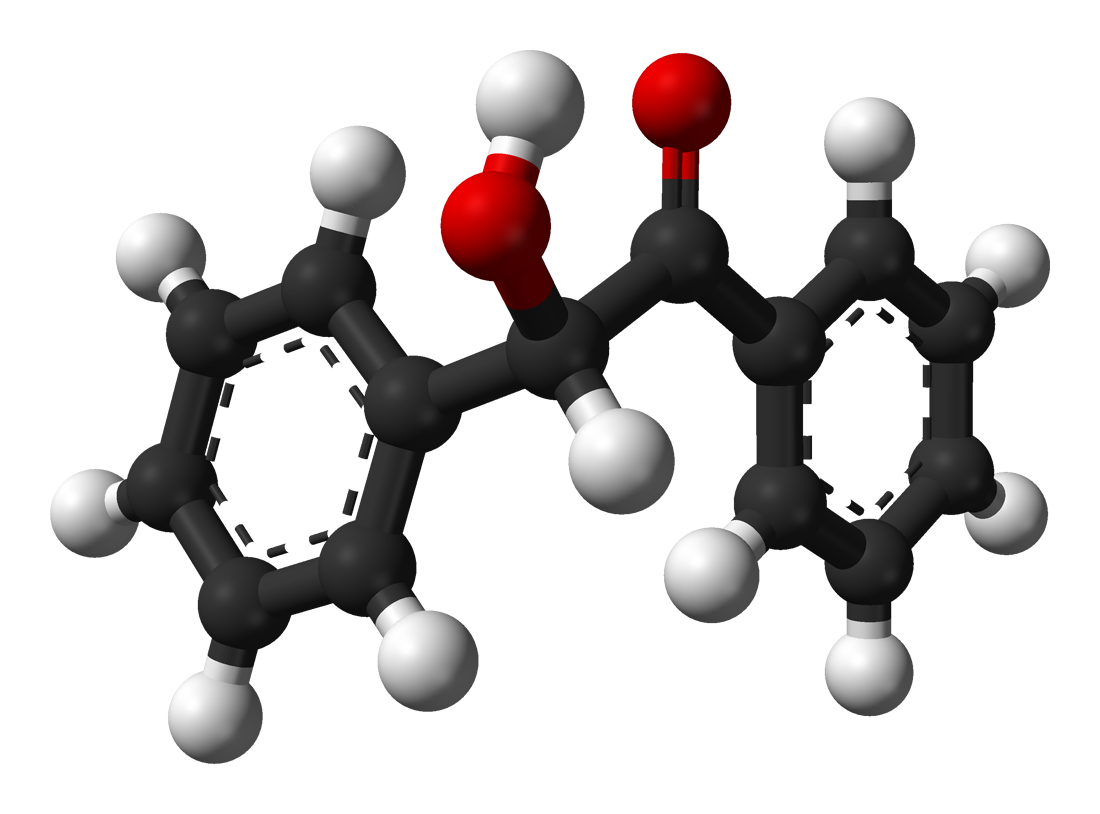

Names
- Preferred IUPAC name 2-Hydroxy-1,2-diphenylethan-1-one
- Other names 2-Hydroxy-2-phenylacetophenone; 2-Hydroxy-1,2-diphenylethanone; Desyl alcohol Bitter almond oil camphor

Identifiers
CAS Number	119-53-9
3D model (JSmol)	Interactive image; Interactive image
Beilstein Reference	391839
ChEBI	CHEBI:17682
ChEMBL	ChEMBL190677
ChemSpider	8093
ECHA InfoCard	100.003.938
KEGG	C01408
PubChem CID	8400
RTECS number	DI1590000
UNII	L7J6A1NE81
CompTox Dashboard (EPA)	DTXSID1020144
- InChI: InChI=1S/C14H12O2/c15-13(11-7-3-1-4-8-11)14(16)12-9-5-2-6-10-12/h1-10,13,15H Key: ISAOCJYIOMOJEB-UHFFFAOYSA-N; InChI=1/C14H12O2/c15-13(11-7-3-1-4-8-11)14(16)12-9-5-2-6-10-12/h1-10,13,15H Key: ISAOCJYIOMOJEB-UHFFFAOYAO
- SMILES: O=C(c1ccccc1)C(O)c2ccccc2; c1ccc(cc1)C(C(=O)c2ccccc2)O

Properties
Chemical formula	C_{14}H_{12}O_{2}
Molar mass	212.248 g·mol^{−1}
Appearance	Off-white crystals
Density	1.310 g/cm^{3} (20 °C)
Melting point	135 to 139 °C (275 to 282 °F; 408 to 412 K)
Boiling point	330 to 356 °C (626 to 673 °F; 603 to 629 K)
Solubility in water	Slightly soluble
Solubility in ethanol	Very good
Solubility in ether	Slightly soluble
Solubility in chlorine	Soluble
Solubility in chloroform	Very good

Hazards
- GHS labelling
Hazard statements	H412
Precautionary statements	P273, P501
NFPA 704 (fire diamond)	1 1 0
- Lethal dose or concentration (LD, LC)
LD_{50} (median dose)	10.000 mg/kg
- Except where otherwise noted, data are given for materials in their standard state (at 25 °C [77 °F], 100 kPa). verify (what is ?) Infobox references

Benzoin (/ˈbɛnzoʊ.ɪn/ or /-ɔɪn/) is an organic compound with the formula PhCH(OH)C(O)Ph. It is a hydroxy ketone attached to two phenyl groups. It appears as off-white crystals, with a light camphor-like odor. Benzoin is synthesized from benzaldehyde in the benzoin condensation. It is chiral and it exists as a pair of enantiomers: (R)-benzoin and (S)-benzoin.

Benzoin is not a constituent of benzoin resin obtained from the benzoin tree (Styrax) or tincture of benzoin. The main component in these natural products is benzoic acid.

== History ==
Benzoin was first reported in 1832 by Justus von Liebig and Friedrich Woehler during their research on oil of bitter almond, which is benzaldehyde with traces of hydrocyanic acid. The catalytic synthesis by the benzoin condensation was improved by Nikolay Zinin during his time with Liebig.

== Uses ==
The main use of benzoin is as a precursor to benzil, which is used as a photoinitiator. The conversion proceeds by organic oxidation using copper(II), nitric acid, or oxone. In one study, this reaction is carried out with atmospheric oxygen and basic alumina in dichloromethane.

Benzoin also sees wide spread use in powder coating formulations, where it acts as a degassing agent during the curing stage. This action prevents surface defects such as 'pinholing'.

Benzoin can be used in the preparation of several pharmaceutical drugs including oxaprozin, ditazole, and phenytoin.

== Preparation ==
Benzoin is prepared from benzaldehyde via the benzoin condensation.
