= Organophosphine =

Class of chemical compounds

Organophosphines are organophosphorus compounds with the formula PR_{n}H_{3−n}, where R is an organic substituent. These compounds can be classified according to the value of n: primary phosphines (n = 1), secondary phosphines (n = 2), tertiary phosphines (n = 3). All adopt pyramidal structures. Organophosphines are generally colorless, lipophilic liquids or solids. The parent of the organophosphines is phosphine (PH_{3}).

== 1° vs 2° vs 3° phosphines ==
Organophophines are classified according to the number of organic substituents.

=== Primary phosphines ===
Primary (1°) phosphines, with the formula RPH_{2}, in principle are derived by alkylation (or other organic substitution) of phosphine. Some simple alkyl derivatives such as methylphosphine (CH_{3}PH_{2}) can be prepared by alkylation of phosphine in the presence of base:

MPH_{2} + RX → RPH_{2} + MX (M = Li, Na, K)

A more common synthetic route involves reduction of chlorophosphines with hydride reagents. For example, reduction of dichlorophenylphosphine with lithium aluminium hydride affords phenylphosphine according to the following idealized equation:

2 RPCl_{2} + LiAlH_{4} → 2 RPH_{2} + LiCl + AlCl_{3}

Most primary phosphines are pyrophoric in air.

=== Secondary phosphines ===
Secondary (2°) phosphines, with the formula R_{2}PH, are prepared analogously to the methods used for the primary phosphines. Alternatively, they are also obtained by alkali-metal reductive cleavage of triarylphosphines followed by hydrolysis of the resulting phosphide salt. This route is employed to prepare diphenylphosphine (Ph_{2}PH). Diorganophosphinic acids, R_{2}P(O)OH, can also be reduced with diisobutylaluminium hydride. Secondary phosphines are mildly protic in character.

Secondary phosphines occur in cyclic forms. Three-membered rings are phosphiranes (unsaturated: phosphirenes), five-membered rings are phospholanes (unsaturated: phosphole), and six-membered rings are phosphinanes.

=== Tertiary phosphines ===
Tertiary (3°) phosphines, with the formula R_{3}P, are traditionally prepared by alkylation of phosphorus trichloride using Grignard reagents or related organolithium compounds:

3 RMgX + PCl_{3} → PR_{3} + 3 MgX_{2}

In the case of trimethylphosphine, triphenyl phosphite is used in place of the highly electrophilic PCl_{3}:

3 CH_{3}MgBr + P(OC_{6}H_{5})_{3} → P(CH_{3})_{3} + 3 C_{6}H_{5}OMgBr

Slightly more elaborate methods are employed for the preparation of unsymmetrical tertiary phosphines, with the formula R_{2}R'P. The use of organophosphorus-based nucleophiles is typical. For example, lithium diphenylphosphide is readily methylated with methyl iodide to give methyldiphenylphosphine:

LiP(C_{6}H_{5})_{2} + CH_{3}I → CH_{3}P(C_{6}H_{5})_{2} + LiI

Phosphine is a precursor to some tertiary phosphines by hydrophosphination of alkenes. For example, in the presence of basic catalysts PH_{3} adds of Michael acceptors such as acrylonitrile:

PH_{3} + 3 CH_{2}=CHZ → P(CH_{2}CH_{2}Z)_{3} (Z = NO_{2}, CN, C(O)NH_{2})

Tertiary phosphines of the type PRR′R″ are "P-chiral" and optically stable.

From the commercial perspective, the most important phosphine is triphenylphosphine, several million kilograms being produced annually. It is prepared from the reaction of chlorobenzene, PCl_{3}, and sodium. Phosphines of a more specialized nature are usually prepared by other routes.

=== Di- and triphosphines ===
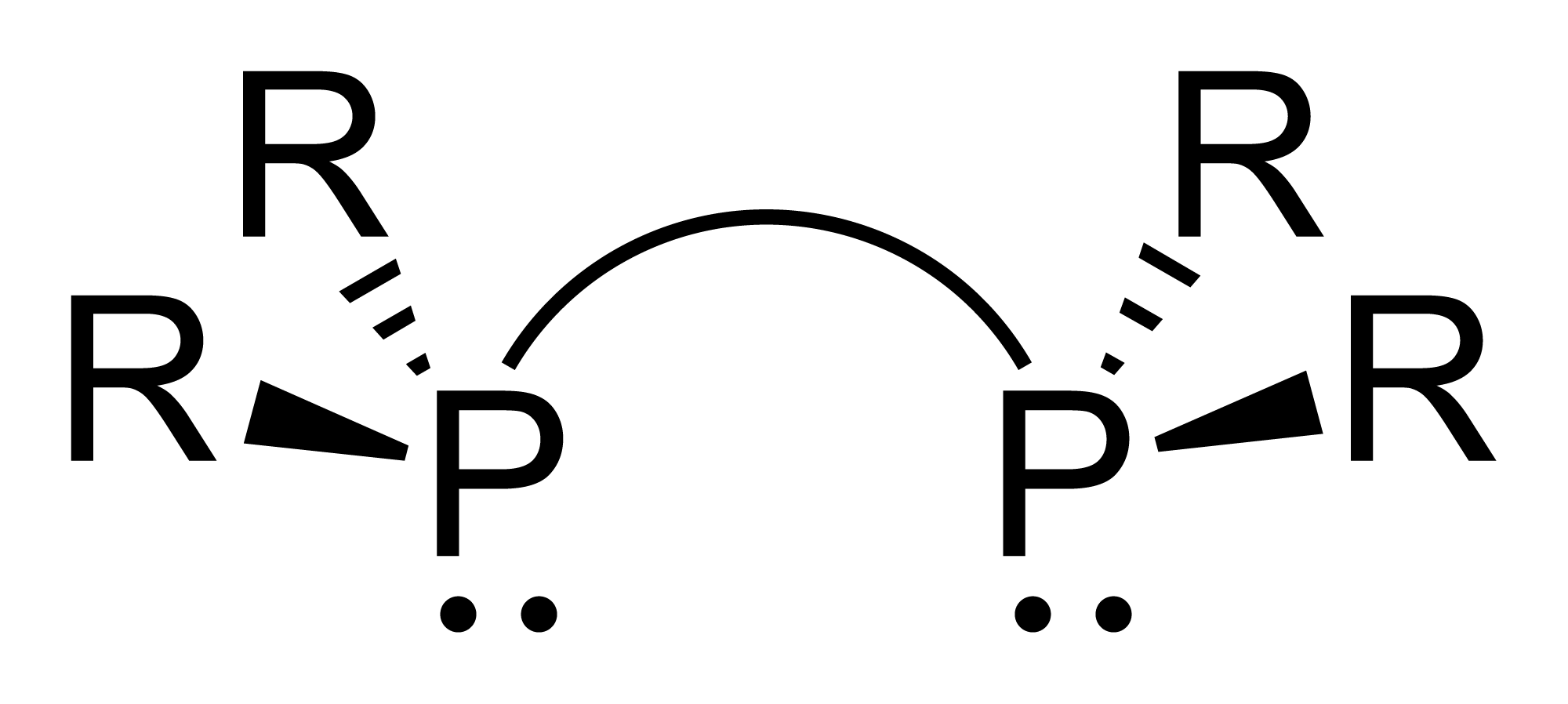
Skeletal formula of a generic diphosphine ligand. R represents a side chain; the phosphine donors are connected by a backbone linker.

Diphosphines are also available in primary, secondary, and tertiary phosphorus substituents. Triphosphines etc. are similar.

== Structure and bonding ==
Organophosphines, like phosphine itself, are pyramidal molecules with approximate C_{3v} symmetry. The C–P–C bond angles are approximately 98.6°. The C–P–C bond angles are consistent with the notion that phosphorus predominantly uses the 3p orbitals for forming bonds and that there is little sp hybridization of the phosphorus atom. The latter is a common feature of the chemistry of phosphorus. As a result, the lone pair of trimethylphosphine has predominantly s-character as is the case for phosphine, PH_{3}.

Tertiary phosphines are pyramidal. When the organic substituents all differ, the phosphine is chiral and configurationally stable (in contrast to NRR'R"). Complexes derived from the chiral phosphines can catalyse reactions to give chiral, enantioenriched products.

=== Comparison of phosphines and amines ===
The phosphorus atom in phosphines has a formal oxidation state −3 (σ^{3}λ^{3}) and are the phosphorus analogues of amines. Like amines, phosphines have a trigonal pyramidal molecular geometry although often with smaller C-E-C angles (E = N, P), at least in the absence of steric effects. The C-P-C bond angle is 98.6° for trimethylphosphine increasing to 109.7° when the methyl groups are replaced by tert-butyl groups. When used as ligands, the steric bulk of tertiary phosphines is evaluated by their cone angle. The barrier to pyramidal inversion is also much higher than nitrogen inversion to occur, and therefore phosphines with three different substituents can be resolved into thermally stable optical isomers. Phosphines are often less basic than corresponding amines, for instance the phosphonium ion itself has a pK_{a} of −14 compared to 9.21 for the ammonium ion; trimethylphosphonium has a pK_{a} of 8.65 compared to 9.76 for trimethylammonium. However, triphenylphosphine (pK_{a} 2.73) is more basic than triphenylamine (pK_{a} −5), mainly because the lone pair of the nitrogen in NPh_{3} is partially delocalized into the three phenyl rings. Whereas the lone pair on nitrogen is delocalized in pyrrole, the lone pair on phosphorus atom in the phosphorus equivalent of pyrrole (phosphole) is not. The reactivity of phosphines matches that of amines with regard to nucleophilicity in the formation of phosphonium salts with the general structure PR_{4}^{+}X^{−}. This property is used in the Appel reaction for converting alcohols to alkyl halides. Phosphines are easily oxidized to the corresponding phosphine oxides, whereas amine oxides are less readily generated. In part for this reason, phosphines are very rarely encountered in nature.

== Reactions ==
=== Coordination chemistry ===
Tertiary phosphines are often used as ligands in coordination chemistry. The binding of phosphines bind to metals, which serve as Lewis acids. For example, silver chloride reacts with triphenylphosphine to 1;1 and 1:2 complexes:

PPh_{3} + AgCl → ClAgPPh_{3}
PPh_{3} + ClAgPPh_{3} → ClAg(PPh_{3})_{2}

The adducts formed from phosphines and borane are useful reagents. These phosphine-boranes are air-stable, but the borane protecting group can be removed by treatment with amines.

=== Quaternization ===
Akin to complexation, phosphines are readily alkylated. For example, methyl bromide converts triphenylphosphine to the methyltriphenylphosphonium bromide, a "quat salt":

PPh_{3} + CH_{3}Br → [CH_{3}PPh_{3}^{+}]Br^{−}

Phosphines are nucleophilic catalysts in organic synthesis, e.g. the Rauhut–Currier reaction and Baylis-Hillman reaction.

=== Protonation and deprotonation ===
Like phosphine itself, but easier, organophosphines undergo protonation. The reaction is reversible. Whereas organophosphines are oxygen-sensitive, the protonated derivatives are not.

Primary and secondary derivatives, they can be deprotonated by strong bases to give organophosphide derivatives. Thus diphenylphosphine reacts with organolithium reagent to give lithium diphenylphosphide:

HPPh_{2} + RLi → LiPPh_{2} + RH

=== Oxidation and sulfiding ===
Tertiary phosphines characteristically oxidize to give phosphine oxides with the formula R_{3}PO. The reaction with oxygen is spin-forbidden but still proceeds at sufficient rate that samples of tertiary phosphines are characteristically contaminated with phosphine oxides. Qualitatively, the rates of oxidation are higher for trialkyl vs triarylphosphines. Faster still are oxidations using hydrogen peroxide. Primary and secondary phosphines also oxidize, but the product(s) are subject to tautomerization and further oxidation.

Tertiary phosphines characteristically oxidize to give phosphine sulfides.

The reducing properties of organophosphiines is also illustrated in the Staudinger reduction for the conversion of organic azides to amines and in the Mitsunobu reaction for converting alcohols into esters. In these processes, the phosphine is oxidized to phosphorus(V). Phosphines have also been found to reduce activated carbonyl groups, for instance the reduction of an α-keto ester to an α-hydroxy ester in scheme 2. In the proposed reaction mechanism, the first proton is on loan from the methyl group in trimethylphosphine (triphenylphosphine does not react).

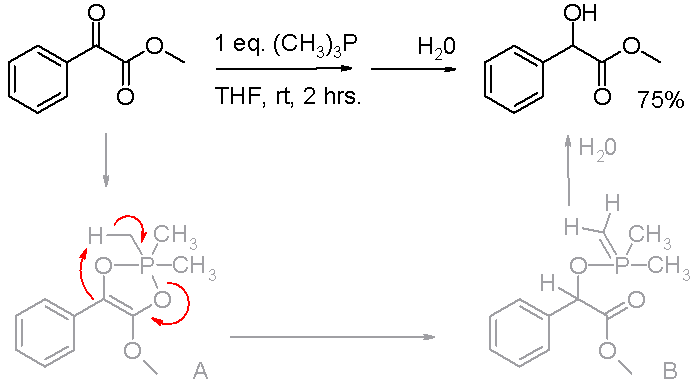
Reduction of activated carbonyl groups by alkyl phosphines

=== Hydrophosphination ===
Primary (RPH_{2}) and secondary phosphines (RRPH and R_{2}PH) add to alkenes in presence of a strong base (e.g., KOH in DMSO). Markovnikov's rules apply. Similar reactions occur involving alkynes. Base is not required for electron-deficient alkenes (e.g., derivatives of acrylonitrile) and alkynes.

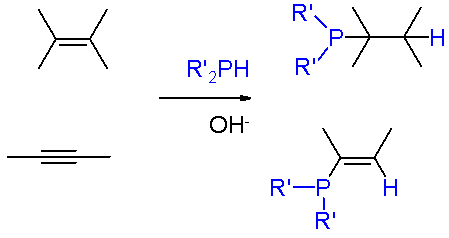
Scheme 1. Addition of phosphine and phosphines to alkenes and alkynes

Primary and secondary phosphines do not normally add to ketones and aldehydes unless the addition closes a ring:

R_{2}PH + R'_{2}C=O → R_{2}PC(OH)HR'_{2}

== See also ==
- Diphosphines, R_{2}PPR_{2}, R_{2}P(CH_{2})_{n}PR_{2}
- Phosphine oxide, R_{3}P=O
- Phosphorane, PR_{5}, R_{3}P=CR_{2}
- Phosphinite, P(OR)R_{2}
- Phosphonite, P(OR)_{2}R
- Phosphite, P(OR)_{3}
- Phosphinate, R_{2}P(RO)O
- Phosphonate, RP(RO)_{2}O
