= Phosphinidene =

Type of compound

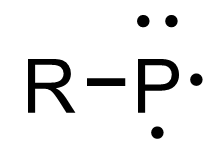
General structure of a phosphinidene

Phosphinidenes (IUPAC: phosphanylidenes, formerly phosphinediyls) are low-valent phosphorus compounds analogous to carbenes and nitrenes, having the general structure RP. The parent phosphinidine has the formula PH. More common are the organic analogues where R = alkyl or aryl. In these compounds phosphorus has only 6 electrons in its valence level. Most phosphinidenes are highly reactive and short-lived, thereby complicating empirical studies on their chemical properties.

A variety of strategies have been employed to stabilize phosphinidenes (e.g. π-donation, steric protection, transition metal complexation), Furthermore reagents and systems have been developed that can generate and transfer phosphinidenes as intermediates in the synthesis of various organophosphorus compounds.

== Electronic structure ==
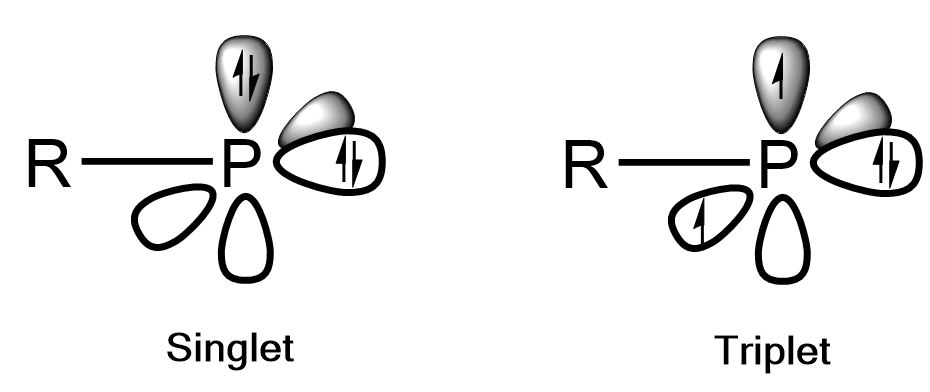
Singlet and Triplet Phosphinidenes

Like carbenes, phosphinidenes can exist in either a singlet state or triplet state, with the triplet state typically being more stable. The stability of these states and their relative energy difference (the singlet-triplet energy gap) depends on the substituents. The ground state in the parent phosphinidene (PH) is a triplet that is 22 kcal/mol more stable than the lowest singlet state. This singlet-triplet energy gap is considerably larger than that of the simplest carbene methylene (9 kcal/mol).

Ab initio calculations from Nguyen et al. found that alkyl- and silyl-substituted phosphinidenes have triplet ground states, possibly in-part due to a negative hyperconjugation. Substituents containing lone pairs (e.g. -NX_{2}, -OX, -PX_{2} ,-SX) stabilize the singlet state, presumably by π-donation into an empty phosphorus 3p orbital; in most of these cases, the energies of the lowest singlet and triplet states were close to degenerate. A singlet ground state could be induced in amino- and phosphino-phosphinidenes by introducing bulky β-substituents, which are thought to destabilize the triplet state by distorting the pyramidal geometry through increased nuclear repulsion.

== Case studies ==
=== Dibenzo-7-phosphanorbornadiene derivatives ===
One way to generate phosphinidines employs the decyclization of phosphaanthracene complexes.

Treatment of a bulky phosphine chloride (RPCl_{2}) with magnesium anthracene affords a dibenzo-7-phosphanorbornadiene compound (RPA). Under thermal conditions, the RPA compound (R = NiPr_{2}) decomposes to yield anthracene; kinetic experiments found this decomposition to be first-order. It was hypothesized that the amino-phosphinidene iPr_{2}NP is formed as a transient intermediate species, and this was corroborated by an experiment where 1,3-cyclohexadiene was used as a trapping agent, forming anti-iPr_{2}NP(C_{6}H_{8}).

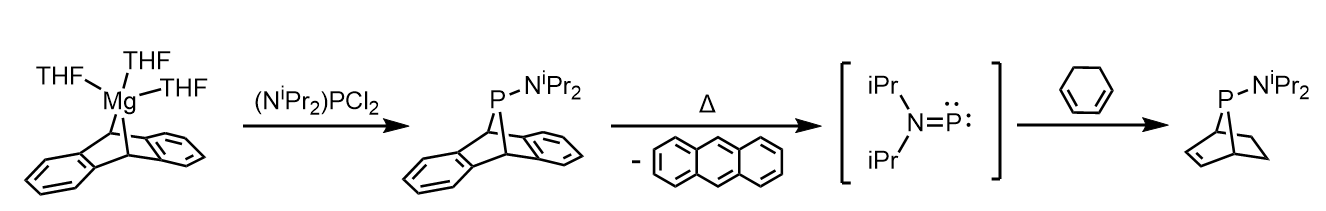
Synthesis of RPA (R = NiPr_{2}) and an example phosphinidene transfer reaction with 1,3-cyclohexadiene

Molecular beam mass spectrometry has enabled the detection of the evolution of amino-phosphinidene fragments from a number of alkylamide derivatives (e.g. Me_{2}NP+ and Me_{2}NPH+ from Me_{2}NPA) in the gas-phase at elevated temperatures.

=== Phosphino-phosphinidene ===
The first singlet phosphino-phosphinidene has been prepared using extremely bulky substituents. The authors prepared a chlorodiazaphospholidine with bulky (2,6-bis[(4-tert-butylphenyl)methyl]-4-methylphenyl) groups, and then synthesized the corresponding phosphaketene. Subsequent photolytic decarbonylation of the phosphaketene produced the phosphino-phosphinidene product as a yellow-orange solid that is stable at room temperature but decomposes immediately in the presence of air and moisture. ^{31}P NMR spectroscopy shows assigned product peaks at 80.2 and -200.4 ppm, with a J-coupling constant of J_{PP} = 883.7 Hz. The very high P-P coupling constant is indicative of P-P multiple bond character. The air/water sensitivity and high solubility of this compound prevented characterization by X-ray crystallography.

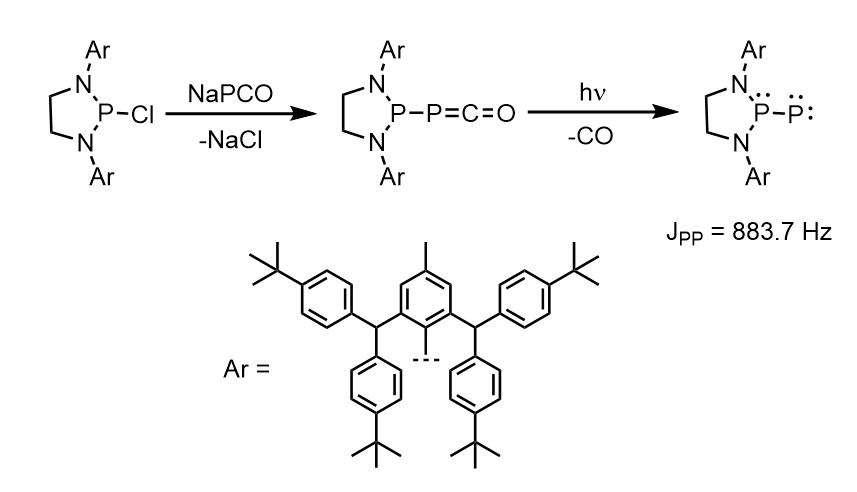
Synthesis of a stable singlet phospino-phosphinidene with bulky 2,6-bis[4-tert-butylphenyl)methyl]-4-methylphenyl substituents as reported by Bertrand and coworkers.

Density functional theory and Natural bond orbital (NBO) calculations were used to gain insight into the structure and bonding of these phosphino-phosphinidenes. DFT calculations at the M06-2X/Def2-SVP level of theory on the phospino-phosphinidene with bulky 2,6-bis[4-tert-butylphenyl)methyl]-4-methylphenyl groups suggest that the tri-coordinated phosphorus atom exists in a planar environment. Calculations at the M06-2X/def2-TZVPP//M06-2X/def2-SVP level of theory were applied to a simplified model compound with diisopropylphenyl (Dipp) groups so as to reduce the computational cost for detailed NBO analysis. Inspection of the outputted wavefunctions shows that the HOMO and HOMO-1 are P-P π-bonding orbitals and the LUMO is a P-P π*-antibonding orbital. Further evidence of multiple bond character between the phosphorus atoms was provided by natural resonance theory and a large Wiberg bond index (P_{1}-P_{2}: 2.34). Natural population analysis assigned a negative partial charge to the terminal phosphorus atom (-0.34 q) and a positive charge to the tri-coordinated phosphorus atom (1.16 q).

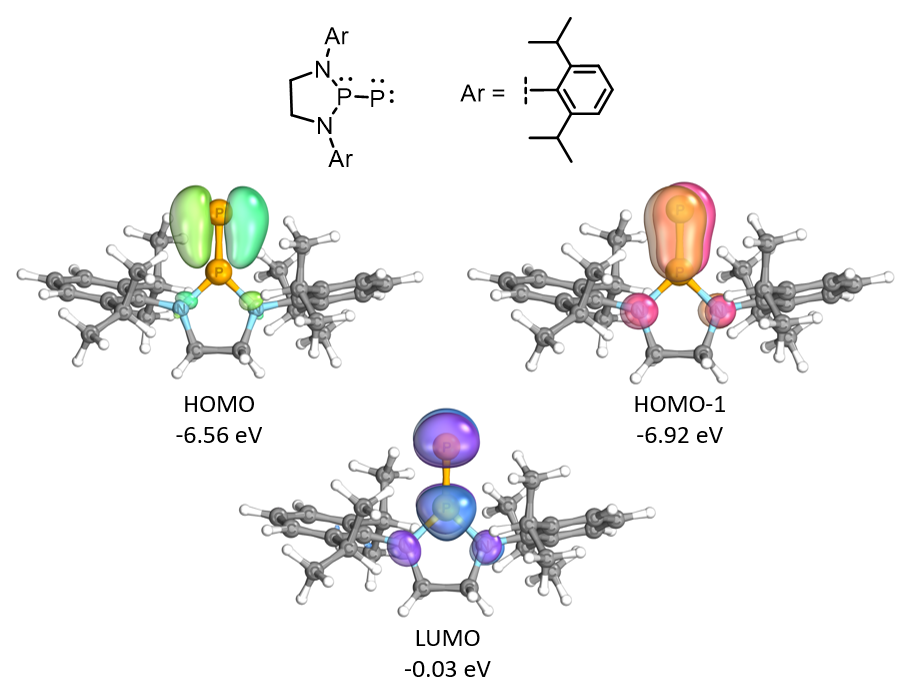
Frontier molecular orbitals of a model phosphino-phosphinidene with "Dipp" groups. Calculations were performed at the M06-2X/def2-TZVPP//M06-2X/def2-SVP level of theory. Reproduced from Bertrand and coworkers with NBO 6.0 in ORCA. 4.2.0 and visualized in IBOview.

Despite the negative charge on the terminal phosphorus atom, subsequent studies have shown that this particular phosphinidene is electrophilic at the phosphinidene center. This phosphino-phosphinidene reacts with a number of nucleophiles (CO, isocyanides, carbenes, phosphines, etc.) to form phosphinidene-nucleophile adducts Upon nucleophilic addition, the tri-coordinated phosphorus atom becomes non-planar, and it is postulated that the driving force of the reaction is provided by the instability of the phosphinidene's planar geometry.

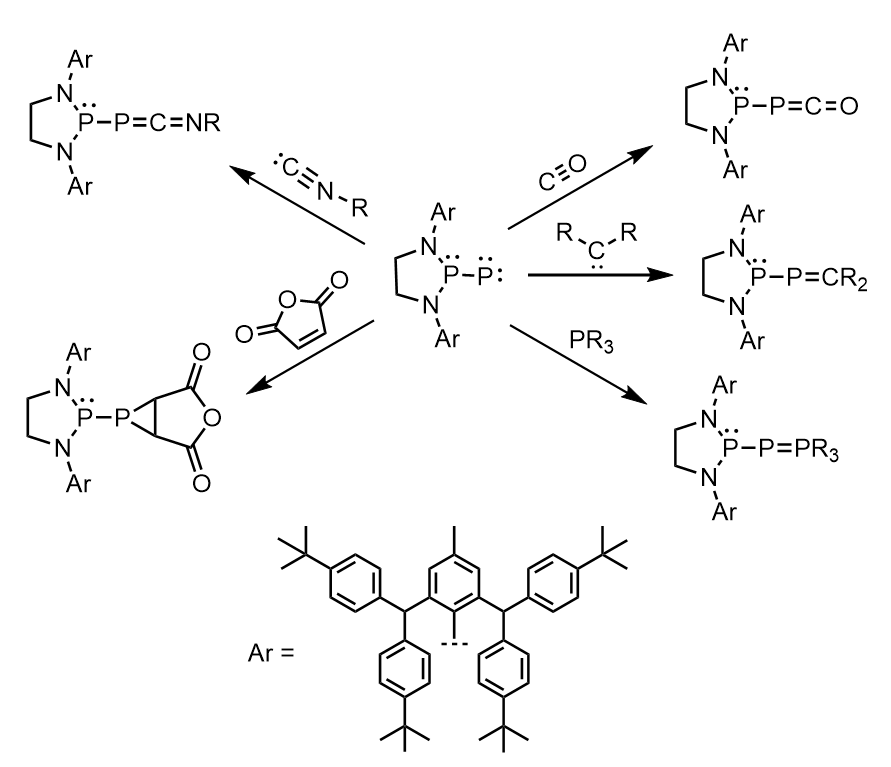
Reactivity of phosphino-phosphinidene with various nucleophiles

=== Phospha-Wittig fragmentation ===
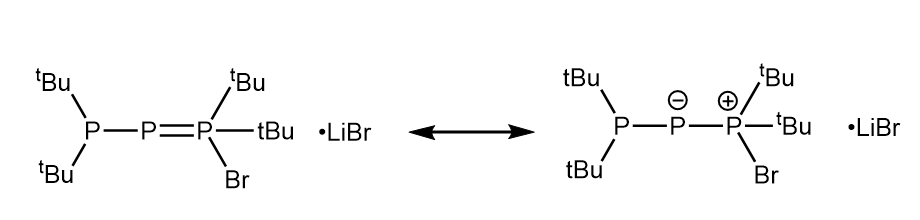
Dominant resonance structures of the phospha-Wittig reagent from Fritz et al.

In 1989, Fritz et al. synthesized the phospha-Wittig species shown to the right. Phospha-Wittig compounds can be viewed as a phosphinidene stabilized by a phosphine. These compounds have been given the label of "phospha-Wittig" as they have two dominant resonance structures (a neutral form and a zwitterionic form) that are analogous to those of the phosphonium ylides that are used in the Wittig reaction.

Fritz et al. found that this particular phospha-Wittig reagent thermally decomposes at 20 °C to give ^{t}Bu_{2}PBr, LiBr, and cyclophosphanes. The authors proposed that the singlet phosphino-phosphinidene ^{t}Bu_{2}PP was formed as an intermediate in this reaction. Further evidence for this was provided by trapping experiments, where the thermal decomposition of the phospha-Wittig reagent in the presence of 3,4,-dimethyl-1,3-butadiene and cyclohexene gave rise to the products shown in the figure below.

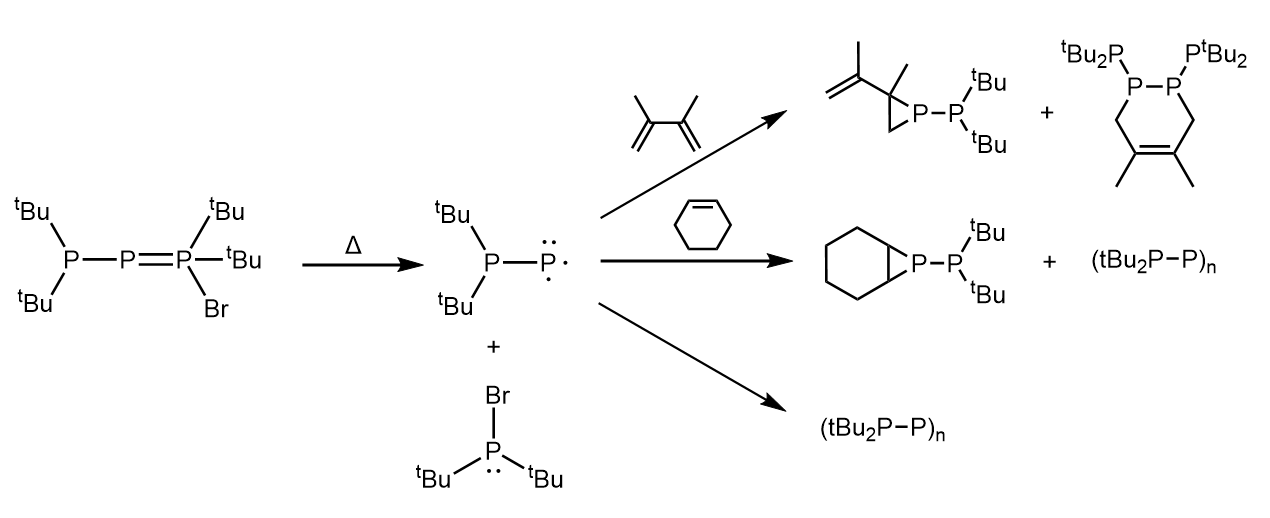
Reactivity of the phopha-Wittig reagent as described in Fritz et al.

=== Metal complexes ===
==== Terminal phosphinidine complexes ====
Terminal transition-metal-complexed phosphinidenes L_{n}M=P-R are phosphorus analogs of transition metal carbene complexes. The first "metal-phosphinidine" was reported by Marinetti et al. They generated the transient species [(OC)_{5}M=P-Ph] by fragmentation of 7-phosphanorbornadiene molybdenum and tungsten complexes inside a mass spectrometer. Soon after, they discovered that these 7-phosphanorbornadiene complexes could be used to transfer the phosphinidene complex [(OC)_{5}M=P-R] to various unsaturated substrates.

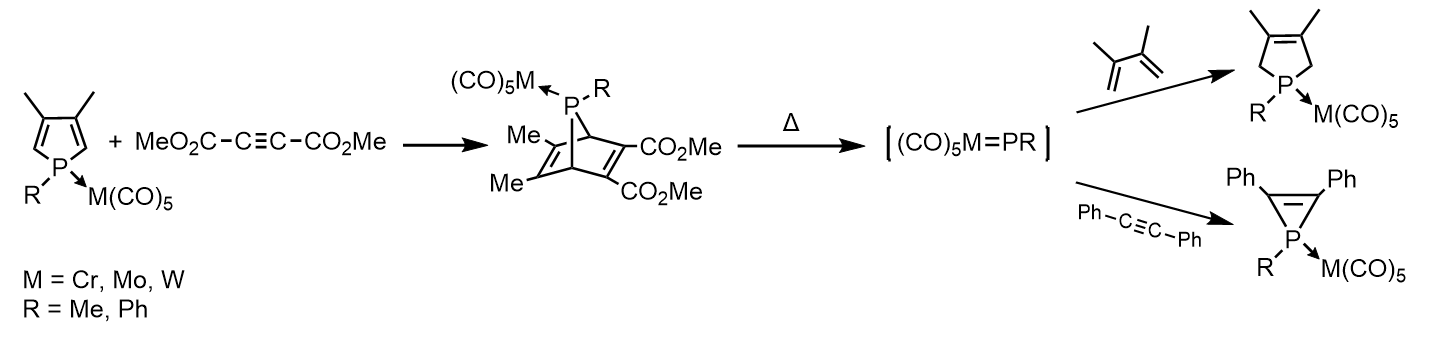
Synthesis and reactivity of several 7-phosphanorbornadiene complexes

Donor-stabilized terminal phosphinidene complexes are also known, which could release free phosphinidene complexes L_{n}M=P-R at mild conditions by P-donor dissociation reactions. The phosphinidene complexes decomposed to white phosphorus if no unsaturated substrates were provided.

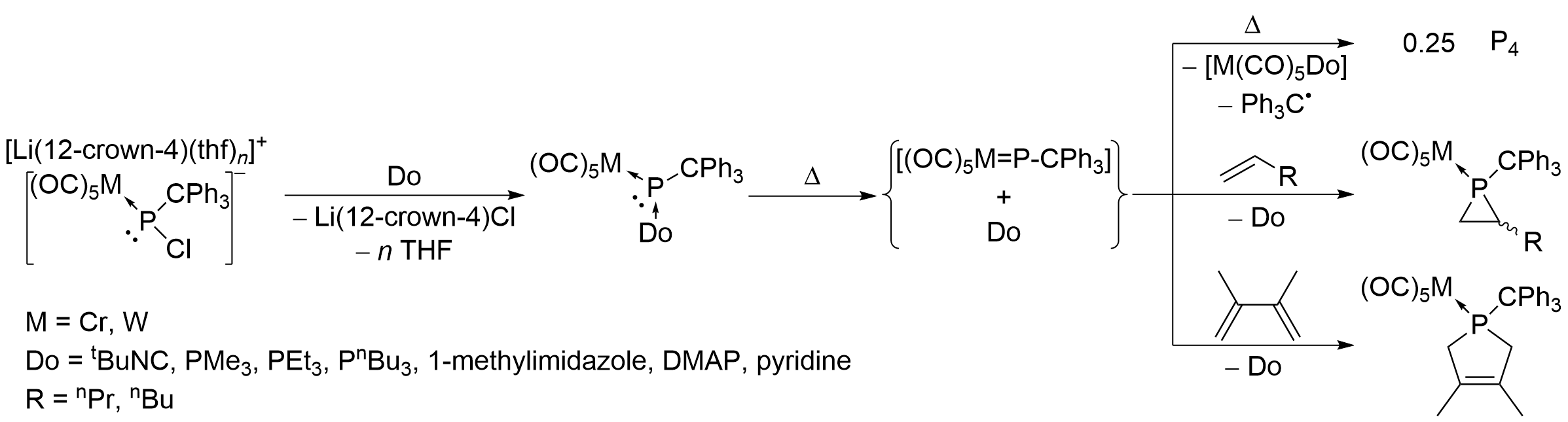
Synthesis and reactivity of donor-to-phosphinidene complex adducts.

Terminal phosphinidene complexes of the type Cp_{2}M=P-R (M = Mo, W) can be obtained by combining aryl-dichlorophosphines RPCl_{2} with [Cp_{2}MHLi]_{4}.

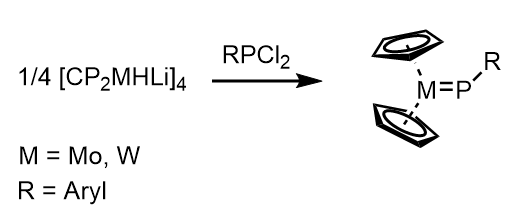
Lappert and coworkers' synthesis of first stable terminal phosphinidene complex

==== Phosphinidine-based clusters ====
Metal clusters containing RP substituents are numerous. They typically arise by the reaction of metal carbonyls with primary phosphines (compounds with the formula RPH_{2}). A partucularly well-studied case is Fe_{3}(PC_{6}H_{5})_{2}(CO)_{9}, which forms from iron pentacarbonyl and phenylphosphine according to the following idealized equation:

3 Fe(CO)_{5} + 2 C_{6}H_{5}PH_{2} → Fe_{3}(PC_{6}H_{5})_{2}(CO)_{9} + 2 H_{2} + 6 CO

A related example is the tert-butylphosphinidene complex (t-BuP)Fe_{3}(CO)_{10}.

== See also ==
- Carbene analog
- Phosphenium – Divalent cations of phosphorus
- Phosphorus compounds
