= Phosphine sulfide =

A phosphine sulfide is an organophosphorus compound with the formula R_{3}PS. They are typically colorless, air-stable solids. A common example of a tertiary phosphine sulfide is triphenylphosphine sulfide. Phosphine sulfides are sometimes intermediates in the synthesis of tertiary phosphines. Phosphine sulfides are tetrahedral.

== Synthesis ==
Phosphine sulfides are usually prepared by the oxidation of tertiary phosphines with elemental sulfur. The heat of formation of phosphine sulfides from tertiary phosphines and elemental sulfur scale with the basicity of the phosphine.

Enthalpy for sulfiding various tertiary phosphines
Tertiary phosphine	∆H (kcal/mol) for reaction with S_{8}	Tertiary phosphine sulfide	CAS No
PCy_{3}	-30.9 ± 1.9	S=PCy_{3}	42201-98-9
PBu_{3}	-28.9 ± 0.3	S=PBu_{3}	3084-50-2
PMe_{3}	-27.1 ± 0.4	S=PMe_{3}	2404-55-9
PMe_{2}Ph	-26.0 ±0.5	S=PMe_{2}Ph	1707-00-2
PMePh_{2}	-23.8 ±0.3	S=PMePh_{2}	13639-74-2
PPh_{3}	-21.5 ±0.3	S=PPh_{3}	3878-45-3
