= Methyldiphenylphosphine =

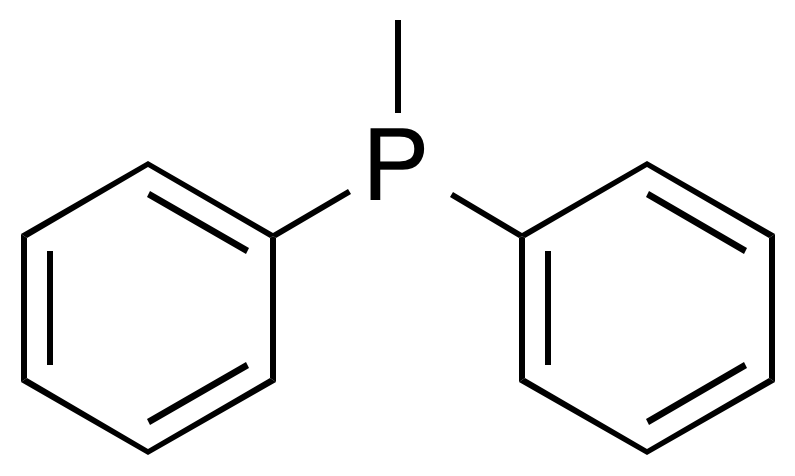

Names
- Other names: Diphenylmethylphosphine; Methyldiphenylphosphane

Identifiers
| CAS Number | 1486-28-8 |
| 3D model (JSmol) | Interactive image |
| Beilstein Reference | 743075 |
| ChemSpider | 66513 |
| ECHA InfoCard | 100.014.605 |
| EC Number | 216-065-5 |
| PubChem CID | 73879 |
| UNII | RYN4FS3JEN |
| CompTox Dashboard (EPA) | DTXSID30164028 |
- InChI: InChI=1S/C13H13P/c1-14(12-8-4-2-5-9-12)13-10-6-3-7-11-13/h2-11H,1H3 Key: UJNZOIKQAUQOCN-UHFFFAOYSA-N
- SMILES: CP(C1=CC=CC=C1)C2=CC=CC=C2

Properties
| Chemical formula | C_{13}H_{13}P |
| Molar mass | 200.221 g·mol^{−1} |
| Appearance | colorless liquid |
| Density | 1.0779 |
| Melting point | 117–118 °C (243–244 °F; 390–391 K) |
| Boiling point | 284 °C (543 °F; 557 K) |

Hazards
- GHS labelling
| Pictograms | (GHS07: Exclamation mark) |
| Signal word | Warning |
| Hazard statements | H302, H315, H319, H335 |
| Precautionary statements | P261, P264, P270, P271, P280, P301+P312, P302+P352, P304+P340, P305+P351+P338, P312, P321, P330, P332+P313, P337+P313, P362, P403+P233, P405, P501 |

Related compounds
| Related compounds | Phenyldimethylphosphine |
- Except where otherwise noted, data are given for materials in their standard state (at 25 °C [77 °F], 100 kPa). Infobox references

Methyldiphenylphosphine is the organophosphine with the formula CH_{3}(C_{6}H_{5})_{2}P, often abbreviated PMePh_{2}. It is a colorless, viscous liquid. It is a member of series (CH_{3})_{3-n}(C_{6}H_{5})_{2}P that also includes n = 0, n = 1, and n = 3 that are often employed as ligands in metal phosphine complexes.

Methyldiphenylphosphine is prepared by reaction of chlorodiphenylphosphine with methyl Grignard reagent:

Cl(C_{6}H_{5})_{2}P + CH_{3}MgBr → CH_{3}(C_{6}H_{5})_{2}P + MgBrCl

Selected derivatives:

- The phosphine oxide OPMePh_{2}, prepared by treatment with hydrogen peroxide.
- The coordination complex MoH_{4}(PMePh_{2})_{4}, prepared by treatment of MoCl_{4}(PMePh_{2})_{2} with sodium borohydride in the presence of excess ligand.
- The coordination complex CoCl_{2}(PMePh_{2})_{2}, prepared by treating cobalt(II) chloride with the phosphine.
- The phosphine-borane H_{3}BPMePh_{2} prepared by treating the phosphine with borane.
