= Phosphenium =

Divalent cations of phosphorus

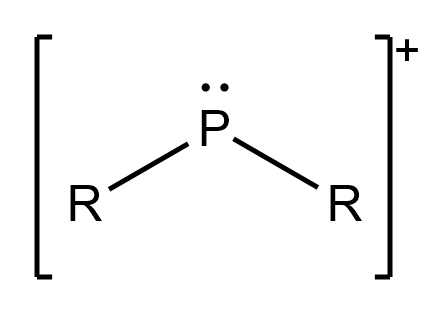
General line structure diagram of phosphenium.

Phosphenium ions, not to be confused with phosphonium or phosphirenium, are dicoordinated cations of phosphorus of the form [PR_{2}]^{+}. Phosphenium ions have long been proposed as reaction intermediates.

== Synthesis ==
=== Legacy methods ===
The first cyclic phosphenium compounds were reported in 1972 by Suzanne Fleming and coworkers. Acyclic phosphenium compounds were synthesized by Fleming's thesis advisor Robert Parry in 1976.

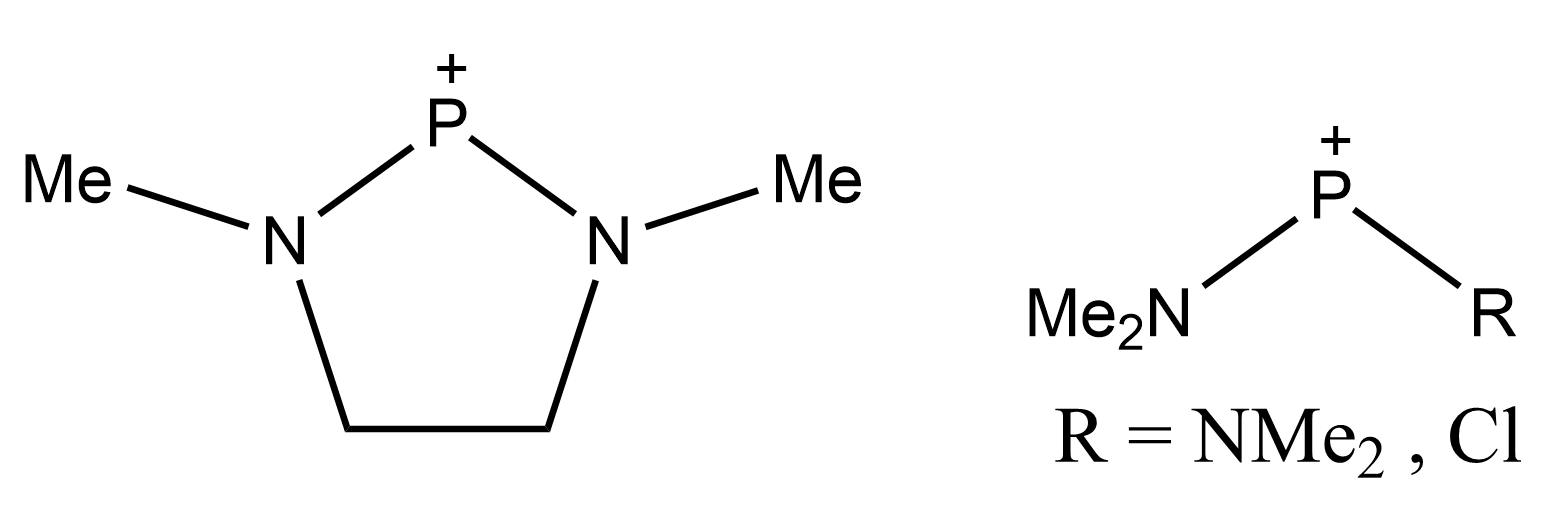
Early examples of phosphenium cations.

=== Methods ===
Several methods exist for the preparation of two-coordinate phosphorus ions. A common method involves halide abstraction from halophosphines:

R_{2}PCl + AlCl_{3} → [R_{2}P^{+}][AlCl^{−}_{4}]

Protonolysis of tris(dimethylamino)phosphine affords the phosphenium salt:

P(NMe_{2})_{3} + 2 HOTf → [P(NMe_{2})_{2}]OTf + [HNMe_{2}]OTf

Weakly coordinating anions are desirable. Triflic acid is often used.

N-heterocyclic phosphenium (NHP) have also been reported. Reaction of PI_{3} with the α-diimine yields the NHP cation by reduction of the diimine and oxidation of iodine.

Redox synthesis of N-heterocyclic phosphenium.

== Structure and bonding ==
According to X-ray crystallography, [(i-Pr_{2}N)_{2}P]^{+} is nearly planar consistent with sp^{2}-hybridized phosphorus center. The planarity of the nitrogen center is consistent with the resonance of the lone pair of the nitrogen atom as a pi bond to the empty phosphorus 3p orbital perpendicular to the N−P−N plane. An idealized sp^{2} phosphorus center would expect an N−P−N angle of 120°. The tighter N−P−N angle observed in the crystal structure can be interpreted as the result of repulsion between the phosphorus lone pair with the bulky i-Pr_{2}N ligands, as the P(NH_{2})^{+}_{2} and PH^{+}_{2} molecules have bond angles closer to 110° and 90°, respectively.

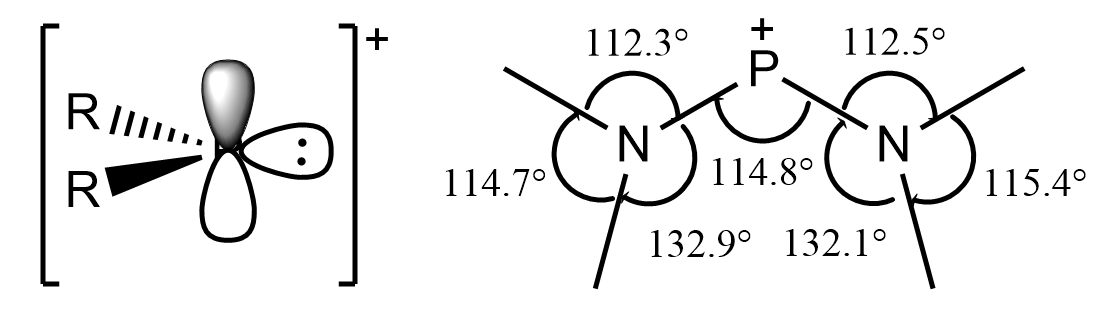
Valence orbital diagram of phosphenium (Left). Structure of model phosphenium (NMe3)P+ determined by X-ray crystallography (Right).

Calculations also show that the analogy to carbenes is lessened by strongly π-donating substituents. With NH_{2} substituents, the phosphenium cation assumes allyl character. Generalized Valence Bond (GVB) calculations of the phosphenium ions as having a singlet ground state, singlet-triplet separation increases with increasing electronegativity of the ligands. The singlet-triplet separation for PH^{+}_{2} and PF^{+}_{2} were calculated to be 20.38 and 84.00 kcal/mol, respectively. Additionally, the triplet state of the phosphenium ion displays a greater bond angle at the phosphorus. For example, the calculated bond angle of the singlet state of PH^{+}_{2} is approximately 94° compared to 121.5° in the triplet state. Calculated bond lengths between the two states are not significantly impacted.

== Reactivity ==
Phosphenium is isoelectronic with singlet (Fisher) carbenes and are therefore expected to be Lewis acidic. Adducts are produced by combining [P(NMe_{2})_{2}]^{+} and P(NMe_{2})_{3}:

P(NMe_{2})_{2}]^{+} + P(NMe_{2})_{3} → [(Me_{2}N)_{3}P−P(NMe_{2})_{2}]^{+}

Being electrophilic, they undergo C−H insertion reactions.

=== Reactions with dienes ===
Phosphenium intermediates are invoked as intermediates in the McCormack reaction, a method for the synthesis of organophosphorus heterocycles. An illustrative reaction involves phenyldichlorophosphine and isoprene:

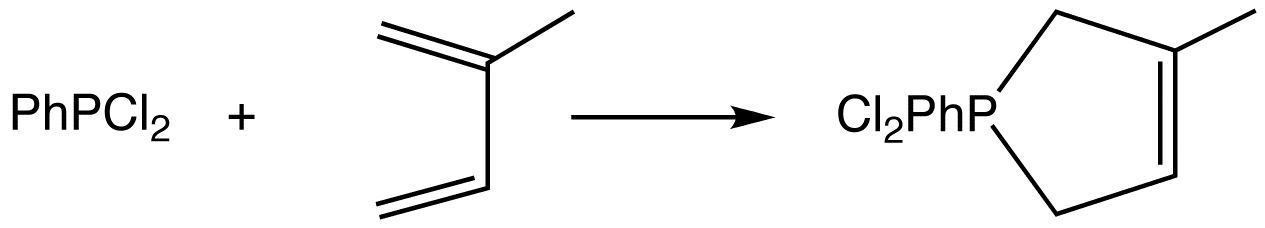

Isolated phosphenium salts undergo this reaction readily.

There are few examples of reactions catalyzed by phosphenium. In 2018, Rei Kinjo and coworkers reported the hydroboration of pyridines by the NHP salt, 1,3,2-diazaphosphenium triflate. The NHP is proposed to act as a hydride transfer reagent in this reaction.

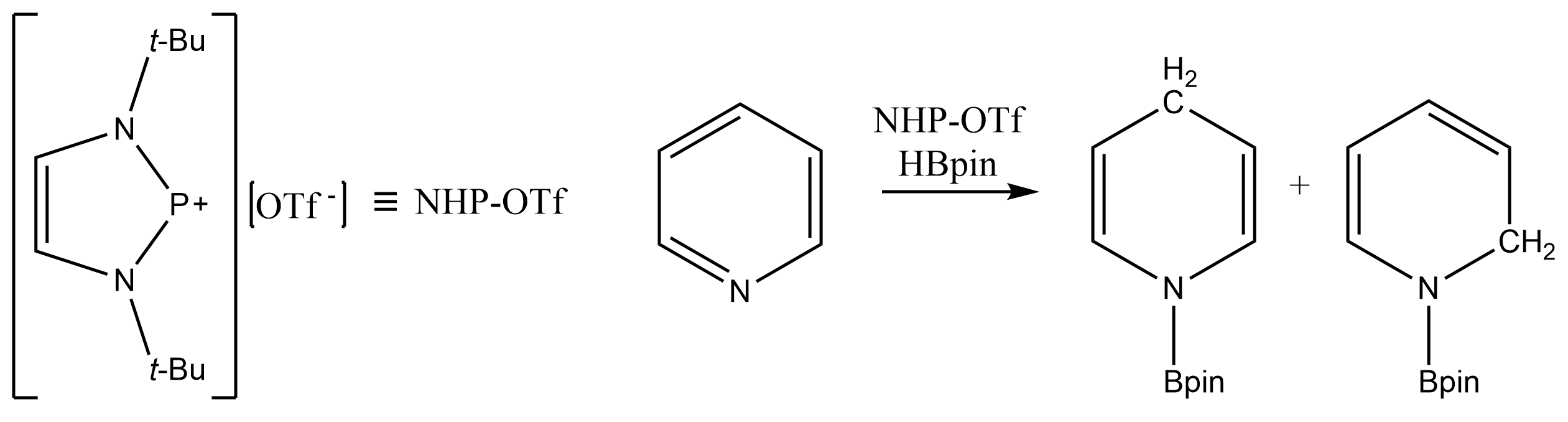
Hydroboration of pyridine catalyzed by NHP. adapted from ref.

=== Coordination chemistry ===
Structure of [(Et_{2}N)_{2}PFe(CO)_{4}]^{+} as the AlCl^{−}_{4} salt.

Phosphenium ions serve as ligands in coordination chemistry. [(R_{2}N)_{2}PFe(CO)_{4}]^{+} was prepared by two methods: the first being the abstraction of a fluoride ion from (R_{2}N)_{2}(F)PFe(CO)_{4} by PF_{5}. The second method is the direct substitution reaction of Fe(CO)_{5} by the phosphenium ion [P(NR_{2})]^{+}. Related complexes exist of the type Fe(CO)_{4}L, where L = [(Me_{2}N)_{2}P]^{+}, [(Et_{2}N)_{2}P]^{+}, [(Me_{2}N)(Cl)P]^{+}, and [(en)P]^{+} (en = C_{2}H_{4}(NH_{2})_{2}).

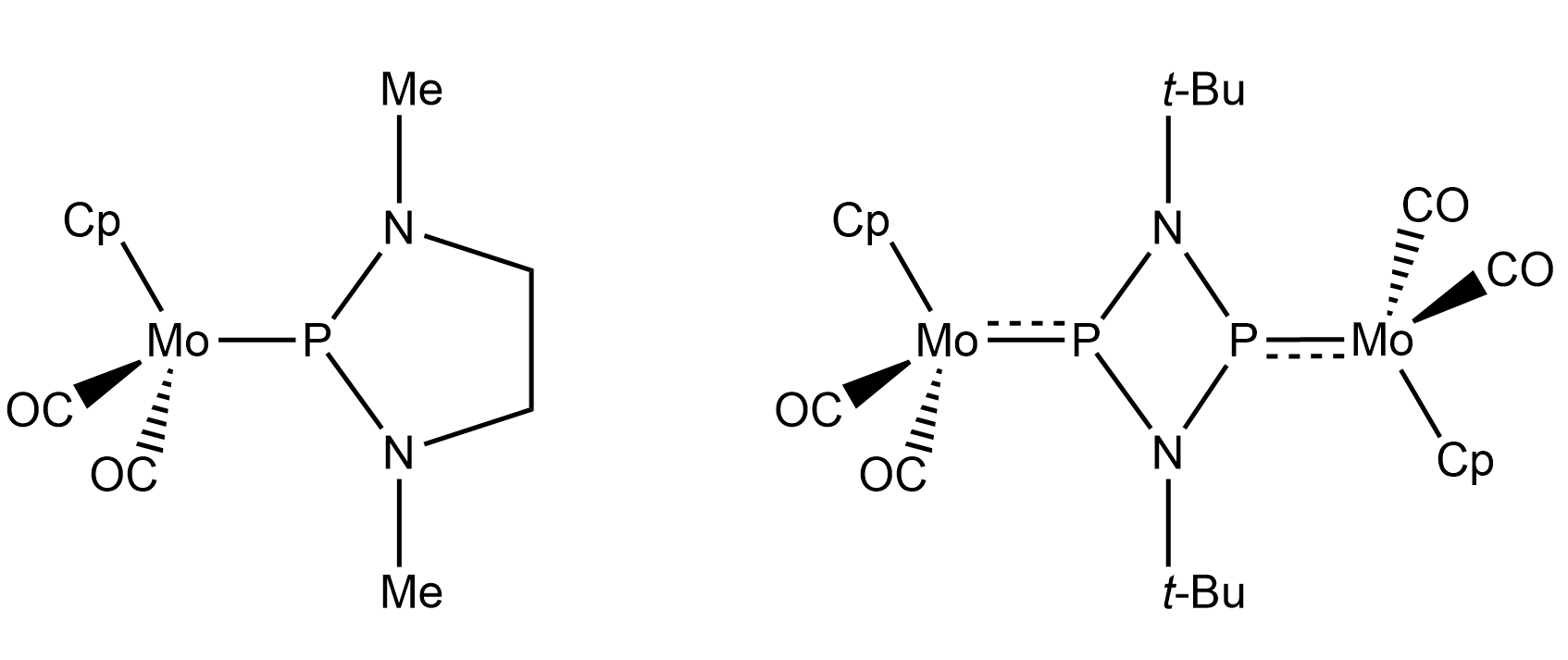
Phosphenium coordination to Mo complexes.

N-heterocyclic phosphenium-transition metal complexes are anticipated due to their isoelectronicity to N-heterocyclic carbenes. In 2004, Martin Nieger and coworkers synthesized two Cobalt-NHP complexes. Experimental and computation analysis of the complexes confirmed the expected L→M σ donation and the M→L π backbonding, though the phosphenium was observed to have reduced σ donor ability. It was suggested that this is due to the greater s orbital-character of the phosphorus lone pair compared to the lone pair of the analogous carbene. Additional studies of NHP ligands by Christine Thomas and coworkers in 2012, likened the phosphenium to nitrosyl. Nitrosyl is well known for its redox non-innocence, coordinating in either a bent or linear geometry that possess different L–M bonding modes. It was observed that NHPs in complex with a transition metal may have either a planar or pyramidal geometry about the phosphorus, reminiscent of the linear versus bent geometries of nitrosyl. Highly electron-rich metal complexes were observed to have pyramidal phosphorus, while less electron-rich metals showed greater phosphenium character at the phosphorus. Pyramidal phosphorus indicates significant lone pair character at phosphorus, suggesting that the L→M σ donation and the M→L π backbonding interactions have been replaced with M→L σ donation, formally oxidizing the metal center by two electrons.

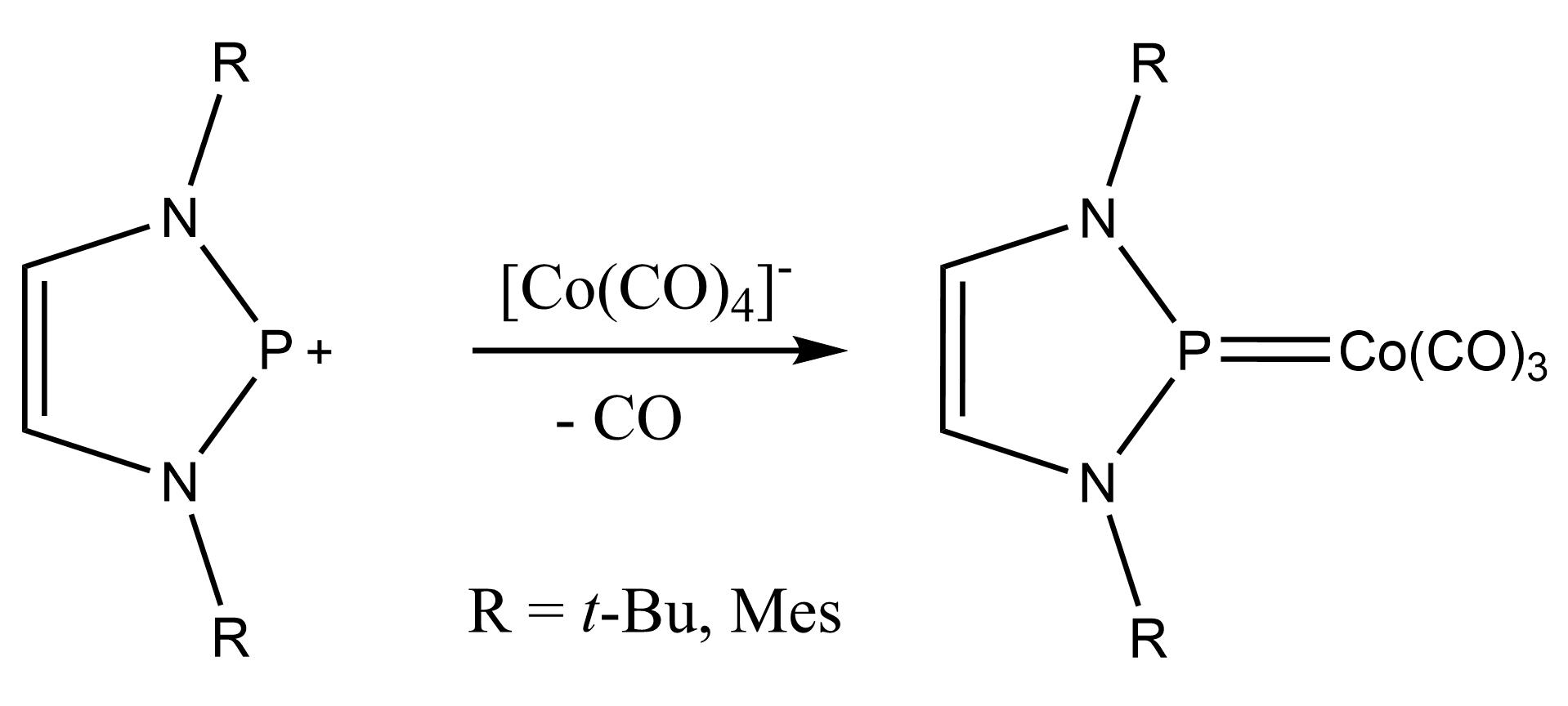
NHP-Cobalt complex. Adapted from ref.

== Additional reading ==
=== Cycloadditions ===
- Cowley, A. H.; Kemp, R. A.; Lasch, J. G.; Norman, N. C.; Stewart, C. A.; Whittlesey, B. R.; Wright, T. C. (1986-03-01). "Reactivity of phosphenium ions toward 1,3- and 1,4-dienes". Inorganic Chemistry. 25 (6): 740–749. doi:10.1021/ic00226a007. ISSN 0020-1669.
- SooHoo, Carlton K.; Baxter, S. G. (1983-11-01). "Phosphenium ions as dienophiles". Journal of the American Chemical Society. 105 (25): 7443–7444. doi:10.1021/ja00363a039. ISSN 0002-7863.
- Thomas, Michael G.; Schultz, Charles W.; Parry, R. W. (1977-05-01). "Synthesis and characterization of dicoordinate phosphorus cations. Compounds of the type [(R_{2}N)_{2}P]^{+}[Y]^{−} and their congeners". Inorganic Chemistry. 16 (5): 994–1001. doi:10.1021/ic50171a005. ISSN 0020-1669.

=== Adducts ===
- Baxter, S. G.; Collins, R. L.; Cowley, A. H.; Sena, S. F. (1983-11-01). "Ferrocenyl-substituted phosphenium cations and phosphide anions". Inorganic Chemistry. 22 (23): 3475–3479. doi:10.1021/ic00165a022. ISSN 0020-1669.
- Cowley, A. H.; Lattman, M.; Wilburn, J. C. (1981-09-01). "NMR study of the reactions of phosphorus(III) halides with halide ion acceptors. Two-coordinate phosphorus cations with bulky ligands". Inorganic Chemistry. 20 (9): 2916–2919. doi:10.1021/ic50223a034. ISSN 0020-1669.

=== Electrophilic reactions ===
- Cowley, A. H.; Kemp, R. A.; Stewart, C. A. (1982-06-01). "Reaction of stannocene and plumbocene with phosphenium ions: oxidative addition of carbon-hydrogen bonds to low-coordination number main group species". Journal of the American Chemical Society. 104 (11): 3239–3240. doi:10.1021/ja00375a061. ISSN 0002-7863.
- Cowley, A. H.; Mehrotra, S. K. (1983-04-01). "Ring methyl to phosphorus hydrogen shifts in pentamethylcyclopentadienyl-substituted phosphorus cations: parallel between main-group and transition-metal chemistry". Journal of the American Chemical Society. 105 (7): 2074–2075. doi:10.1021/ja00345a072. ISSN 0002-7863.

=== Coordination complexes ===
- Day, V. W.; Tavanaiepour, I.; Abdel-Meguid, S. S.; Kirner, J. F.; Goh, L. Y.; Muetterties, E. L. (1982). "Modes of Phosphite Reactions with Transition-Metal Complexes. Crystal Structure of (η^{5}-C_{5}H_{5})Cr[P(O)(OCH_{3})_{2}](CO)_{2}[P(OCH_{3})_{3}]; and [(CH_{3}O)_{2}PMo{P(OCH_{3})_{3}]_{5}}^{+}(PF^{−}_{6})". Inorganic Chemistry. 21: 657–663. doi:10.1021/ic00132a038.
- Hutchins, L. D.; Paine, R. T.; Campana, C. F. (1980). "Structure and Bonding in a Phosphenium Ion-Metal complex, CH_{3}NCH_{2}CH_{2}N(CH_{3})PMo(η^{5}-C_{5}H_{5})(CO)_{2}. An Example of a Molybdenum-Phosphorus Multiple Bond". Journal of the American Chemical Society. 102 (13): 4521–4523. doi:10.1021/ja00533a039. ISSN 0002-7863.
- Light, R. W.; Paine, R. T. (1978). "Interaction of the Dicoordinate Phosphorus Cation 1,3-Dimethyl-1,3,2-Diazaphospholidide with Transition Metal Nucleophiles". Journal of the American Chemical Society. 100 (7): 2230–2231. doi:10.1021/ja00475a043. ISSN 0002-7863.
- Dubois, Donn A.; Duesler, Eileen N.; Paine, Robert T. (1983). "Synthesis and Structure of a Bimetallic Diphosphenium ion Complex Containing a Diazadiphosphetidine Ring". Organometallics. 2 (12): 1903–1905. doi:10.1021/om50006a044. ISSN 0276-7333.
- Hutchins, Larry D.; Duesler, Eileen N.; Paine, Robert T. (1984). "Synthesis and Characterization of Metallophosphenium Ion Complexes Derived from Aminohalophosphites. Crystal and Molecular Structure of [cyclo]Mo(η^{5}-C_{5}H_{5})(CO)_{2}(POCH_{2}CH_{2}NCMe_{3})". Organometallics. 3 (3): 399–403. doi:10.1021/om00081a013. ISSN 0276-7333.
