= Phosphinite =

Organic compounds of the formula P(OR)R2

Structural formula of a generic phosphinite, R represents a side chain.

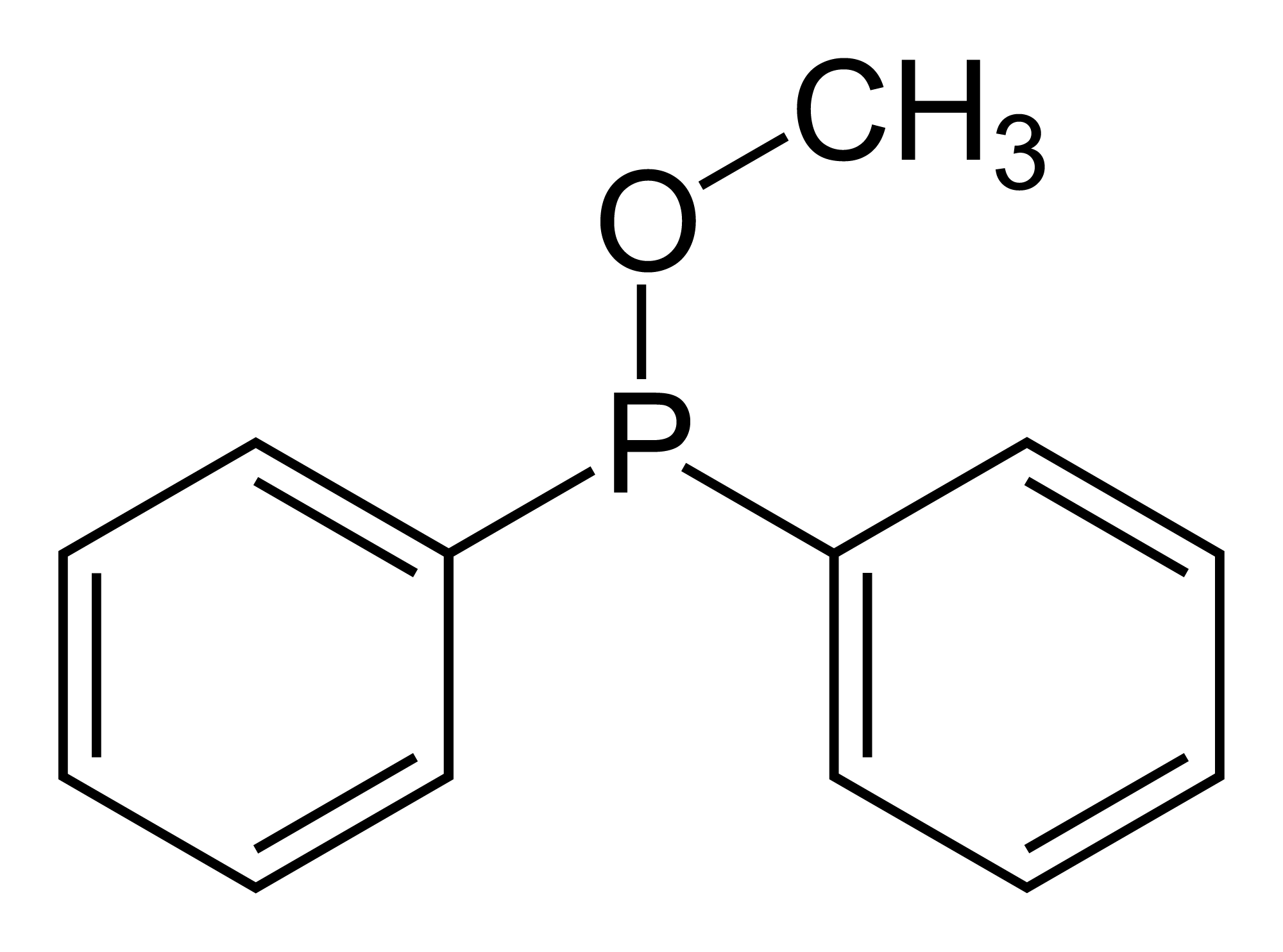
Skeletal formula of methyl diphenylphosphinite

In organic chemistry, phosphinites are organophosphorus compounds with the formula P(OR)R_{2}. They are used as ligands in homogeneous catalysis and coordination chemistry.

== Preparation ==
Phosphinites are prepared by alcoholysis of organophosphinous chlorides. For example, treatment of chlorodiphenylphosphine with methanol and base gives methyl diphenylphosphinite:

ClPPh_{2} + CH_{3}OH → CH_{3}OPPh_{2} + HCl

Although they are esters of phosphinous acids (R_{2}POH), phosphinites are not made via such intermediates.

== Reactions ==
Oxidation of phosphinites gives phosphinates:

2 P(OR)R_{2} + O_{2} → 2 OP(OR)R_{2}

Phosphinites are ligands, giving derivatives similar to metal phosphine complexes. They are stronger pi-acceptors than typical phosphine ligands.

== See also ==
- Phosphine - PR_{3}
- Phosphine oxide - OPR_{3}
- Phosphonite - P(OR)_{2}R
- Phosphite - P(OR)_{3}
- Phosphinate - OP(OR)R_{2}
- Phosphonate - OP(OR)_{2}R
- Phosphate - OP(OR)_{3}
