= Phenylphosphine =

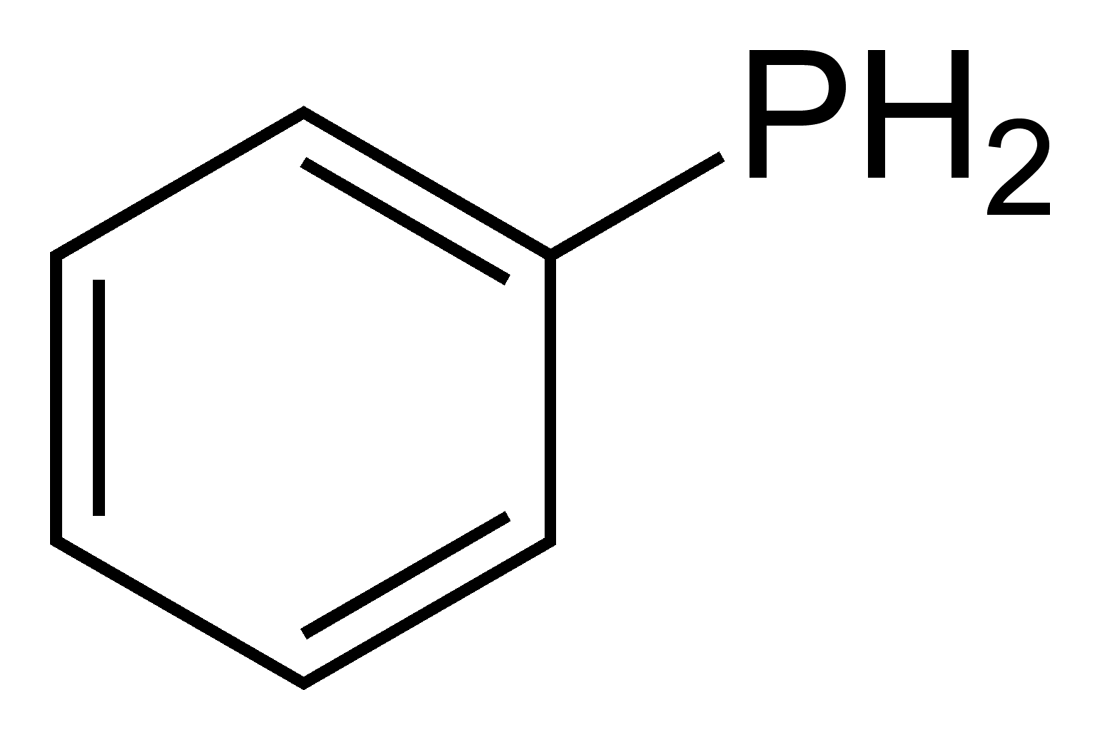

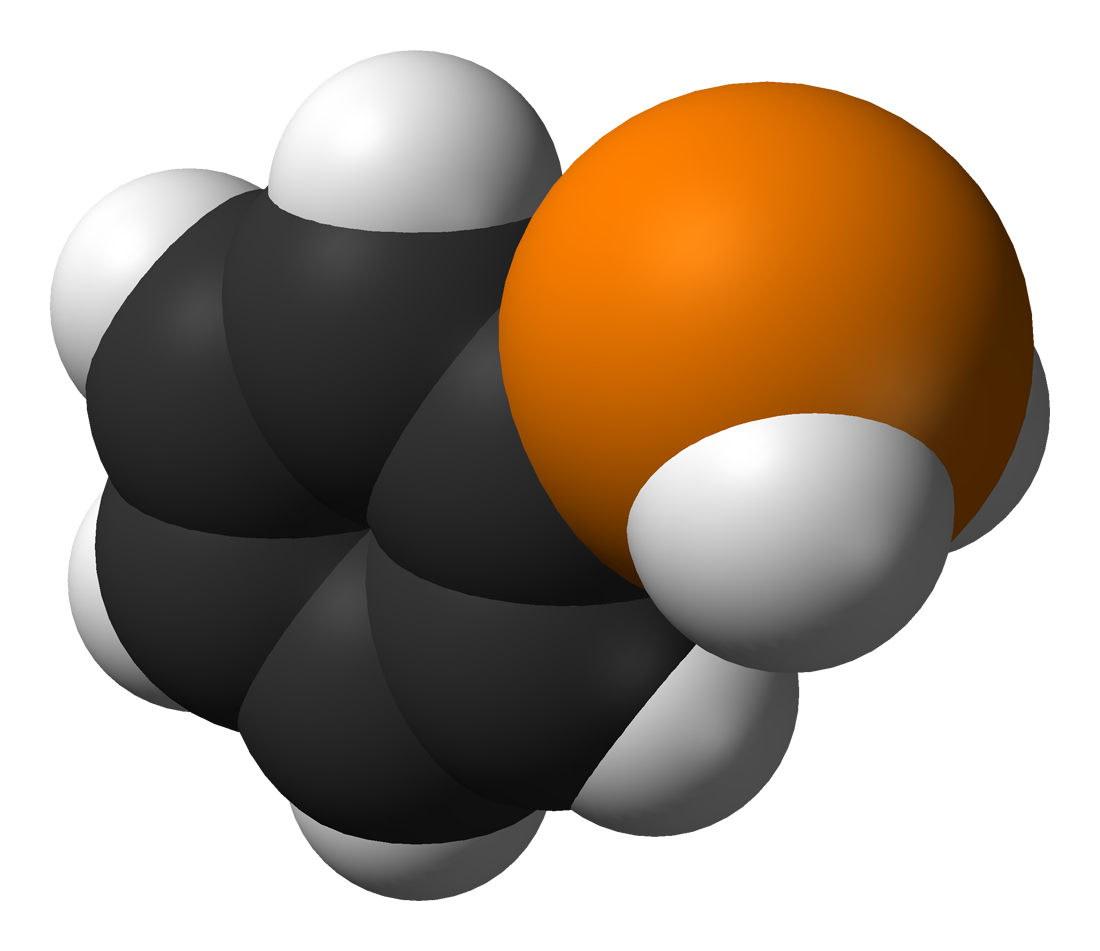

Names
- Preferred IUPAC name Phenylphosphane
- Other names Phenylphosphine; Monophenylphosphine

Identifiers
CAS Number	638-21-1
3D model (JSmol)	Interactive image
ChemSpider	12002
ECHA InfoCard	100.010.297
EC Number	211-325-4
PubChem CID	12519
RTECS number	SZ2100000
UNII	856X9KP929
UN number	2924
CompTox Dashboard (EPA)	DTXSID7073224
- InChI: InChI=1S/C6H7P/c7-6-4-2-1-3-5-6/h1-5H,7H2 Key: RPGWZZNNEUHDAQ-UHFFFAOYSA-N; InChI=1/C6H7P/c7-6-4-2-1-3-5-6/h1-5H,7H2 Key: RPGWZZNNEUHDAQ-UHFFFAOYAH
- SMILES: C1=CC=C(C=C1)P

Properties
Chemical formula	C_{6}H_{7}P
Molar mass	110.096 g·mol^{−1}
Appearance	Colorless liquid
Odor	foul
Density	1.001 g/cm^{3}
Boiling point	160 °C (320 °F; 433 K)

Hazards
- GHS labelling
Pictograms	(GHS02: Flammable) (GHS06: Toxic) (GHS07: Exclamation mark)
Signal word	Warning
Hazard statements	H250, H301, H311, H315, H319, H331, H335
Precautionary statements	P210, P222, P261, P264, P270, P271, P280, P301+P310, P302+P334, P302+P352, P304+P340, P305+P351+P338, P311, P312, P321, P322, P330, P332+P313, P337+P313, P361, P362, P363, P370+P378, P403+P233, P405, P422, P501
- NIOSH (US health exposure limits)
PEL (Permissible)	none
REL (Recommended)	C 0.05 ppm (0.25 mg/m^{3})
IDLH (Immediate danger)	N.D.
- Except where otherwise noted, data are given for materials in their standard state (at 25 °C [77 °F], 100 kPa). verify (what is ?) Infobox references

Phenylphosphine is an organophosphorus compound with the chemical formula C_{6}H_{5}PH_{2}. It is the phosphorus analog of aniline. Like other primary phosphines, phenylphosphine has an intense penetrating odor and is highly oxidizable. It is mainly used as a precursor to other organophosphorus compounds. It can function as a ligand in coordination chemistry.

== Synthesis ==
Phenylphosphine can be produced by reducing dichlorophenylphosphine with lithium aluminum hydride in ether:

LiAlH_{4} + 2C_{6}H_{5}PCl_{2} → 2C_{6}H_{5}PH_{2} + Li^{+} + Al^{3+} + 4Cl^{−}

This reaction is performed under a nitrogen atmosphere to prevent side reactions involving oxygen.

== Reactions ==
Oxidation of phenylphosphine with air affords the oxide.

C_{6}H_{5}PH_{2} + O_{2} → C_{6}H_{5}P(OH)_{2}

Bis(2-cyanoethylphenyl)phosphine, which is of interest as a synthetic intermediate, can be made from phenylphosphine by base-catalyzed allylic addition to acrylonitrile.

C_{6}H_{5}PH_{2} + 2CH_{2}=CHCN → C_{6}H_{5}P(CH_{2}CH_{2}CN)_{2}

Bis(2-cyanoethylphenyl)phosphine is a useful precursor to 1-phenyl-4-phosphorinanone by base-induced cyclization followed by hydrolysis. Phosphorinanones can be used to prepare alkenes, amines, indoles, and secondary and tertiary alcohols by reduction, Grignard, and Reformatsky reagents.

Phenylphosphine reacts with many metal complexes to give complexes and clusters. It is the precursor to the bridging phosphinidene ligand in certain clusters.

2 (C_{6}H_{5})_{2}MCl + C_{6}H_{5}PH_{2} + 3 (C_{2}H_{5})_{3}N → ((C_{6}H_{5})_{2}M)_{2}PC_{6}H_{5} + 3 (C_{2}H_{5})_{3}N•HCl

Phenylphosphine also have uses in polymer synthesis. Using radical initiations or UV irradiation, polyaddition of phenylphosphine to 1,4-divinylbenzene or 1,4-diisopropenylbenzene will form phosphorus-containing polymers, which have self-extinguishing properties. When mixed with flammable polymers such as polystyrene and polyethylene, the mixed polymer exhibits flame resistant properties.
