= McCormack reaction =

Chemical reaction

The McCormack reaction is a method for the synthesis of organophosphorus compounds. In this reaction, a 1,3-diene and a source of R_{2}P^{+} are combined to give phospholenium cation. The reaction is named after W. B. McCormack, a research chemist at duPont.

An illustrative reaction involves phenyldichlorophosphine and isoprene:

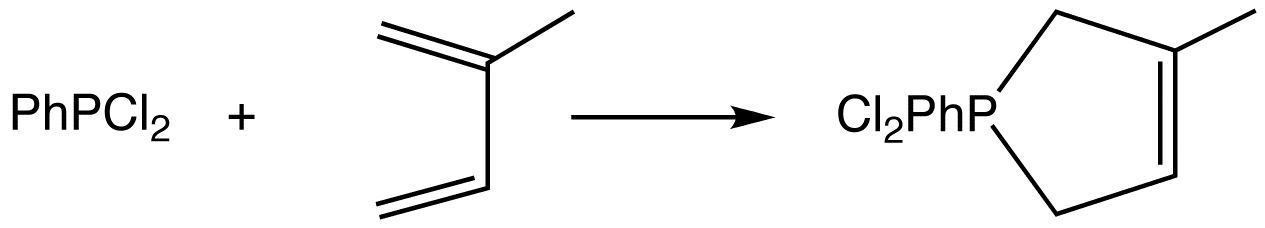

The reaction proceeds via a pericyclic [2+4]-process. The resulting derivatives can be hydrolyzed to give the phosphine oxide. Dehydrohalogenation gives the phosphole.
