= Methylphosphine =

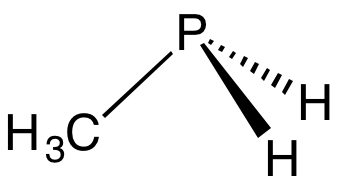

Names
- Other names Methylphosphane

Identifiers
CAS Number	593-54-4
3D model (JSmol)	Interactive image
Abbreviations	MePH_{2}
ChEBI	CHEBI:35887
ChemSpider	62195
PubChem CID	68973
CompTox Dashboard (EPA)	DTXSID00208029
- InChI: InChI=1S/CH5P/c1-2/h2H2,1H3 Key: SAWKFRBJGLMMES-UHFFFAOYSA-N; InChI=1/CH5P/c1-2/h2H2,1H3 Key: SAWKFRBJGLMMES-UHFFFAOYAG
- SMILES: CP

Properties
Chemical formula	CH_{5}P
Molar mass	48.025 g·mol^{−1}
Appearance	colorless gas
Boiling point	−17.1 °C (1.2 °F; 256.0 K)

Hazards
- Occupational safety and health (OHS/OSH)
Main hazards	toxic
- Except where otherwise noted, data are given for materials in their standard state (at 25 °C [77 °F], 100 kPa). Infobox references

Methylphosphine is the simplest organophosphine compound with the formula CH_{3}PH_{2}, often written MePH_{2}. It is a malodorous gas that condenses to a colorless liquid. It can be produced by methylation of phosphanide salts:

KPH_{2} + MeI → MePH_{2} + KI

== Reactions ==
The compound exhibits the properties characteristic of a primary phosphine, i.e., a compound of the type RPH_{2}. It can be oxidized to methylphosphonous acid:

MePH_{2} + O_{2} → MeP(H)O_{2}H

It protonates to give a phosphonium ion:

MePH_{2} + H^{+} → MePH_{3}^{+}

With strong bases, it can be deprotonated to give methylphosphanide derivatives:

MePH_{2} + KOH → K[MePH] + H_{2}O
