= Dimethylphenylphosphine =

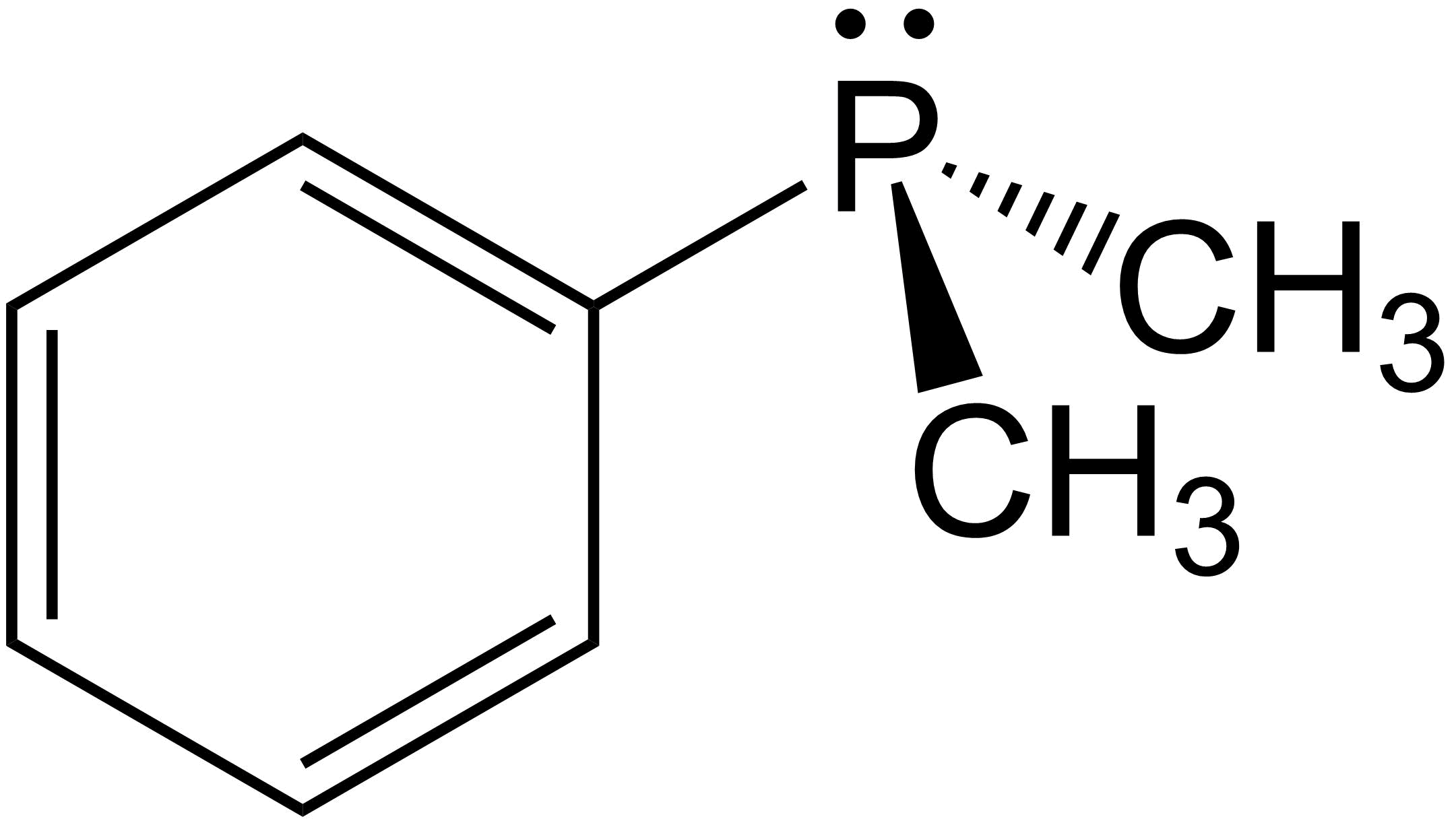
- Dimethylphenylphosphine

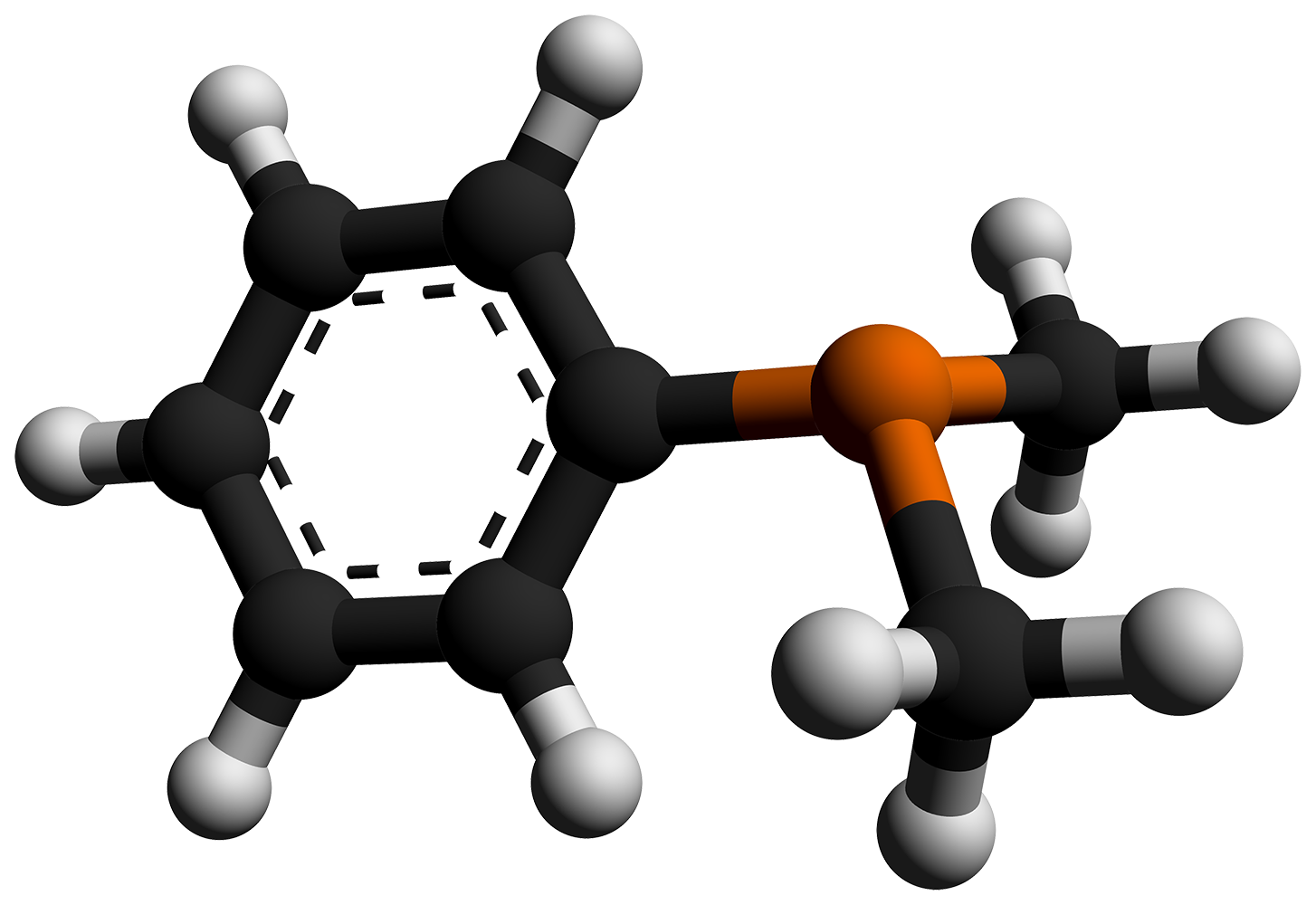

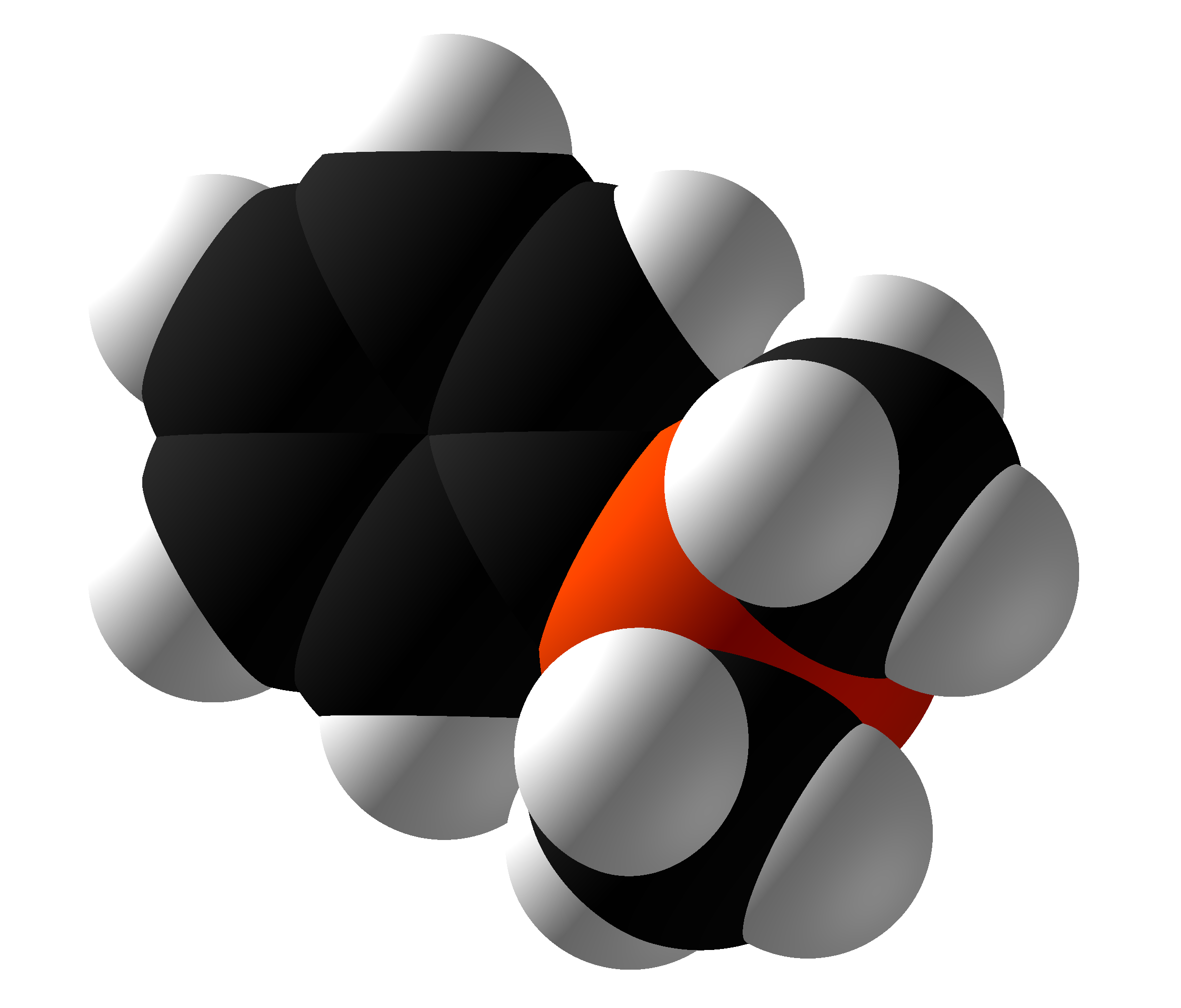

Names
- Preferred IUPAC name Dimethyl(phenyl)phosphane
- Other names Dimethylphenylphosphine

Identifiers
CAS Number	672-66-2
3D model (JSmol)	Interactive image
ChEBI	CHEBI:30671
ChemSpider	62800
ECHA InfoCard	100.010.543
EC Number	211-595-3
PubChem CID	69597
UNII	D3F6WQG46D
CompTox Dashboard (EPA)	DTXSID70217481
- InChI: InChI=1S/C8H11P/c1-9(2)8-6-4-3-5-7-8/h3-7H,1-2H3 Key: HASCQPSFPAKVEK-UHFFFAOYSA-N; InChI=1/C8H11P/c1-9(2)8-6-4-3-5-7-8/h3-7H,1-2H3 Key: HASCQPSFPAKVEK-UHFFFAOYAS
- SMILES: P(c1ccccc1)(C)C

Properties
Chemical formula	C_{8}H_{11}P
Molar mass	138.14 g/mol
Appearance	transparent light pale yellow liquid
Density	0.971 g/cm^{3}
Melting point	N/A
Boiling point	74 to 75 °C (165 to 167 °F; 347 to 348 K) at 12 mmHg
Solubility in water	Insoluble

Structure
Molecular shape	Pyramidal

Hazards
- GHS labelling
Pictograms	(GHS02: Flammable) (GHS07: Exclamation mark)
Signal word	Warning
Hazard statements	H226, H315, H319, H335
Precautionary statements	P210, P233, P240, P241, P242, P243, P261, P264, P271, P280, P302+P352, P303+P361+P353, P304+P340, P305+P351+P338, P312, P321, P332+P313, P337+P313, P362, P370+P378, P403+P233, P403+P235, P405, P501
Flash point	49 °C (120 °F; 322 K)
- Safety data sheet (SDS)
- Except where otherwise noted, data are given for materials in their standard state (at 25 °C [77 °F], 100 kPa). verify (what is ?) Infobox references

Dimethylphenylphosphine is an organophosphorus compound with a formula P(C_{6}H_{5})(CH_{3})_{2}. The phosphorus is connected to a phenyl group and two methyl groups, making it the simplest aromatic alkylphosphine. At room temperature, it appears as colorless air sensitive liquid with a highly unpleasant odor, characteristic of volatile phosphines. It is a member of series (CH_{3})_{3-n}(C_{6}H_{5})_{2}P that also includes n = 0, n = 2, and n = 3 that are often employed as ligands in metal phosphine complexes.

== Preparation ==
Dimethylphenylphosphine is prepared by the reaction of methylmagnesium halide with dichlorophenylphosphine.

(C_{6}H_{5})Cl_{2}P + 2CH_{3}MgBr → (C_{6}H_{5})(CH_{3})_{2}P + 2MgBrCl

The phosphine is purified by distillation under reduced pressure. A solution of (C_{6}H_{5})(CH_{3})_{2}P in CDCl_{3} shows proton NMR signals at δ 7.0-7.5 and a doublet at δ 1.2. The phosphorus-31 NMR spectrum shows a singlet at -45.9 ppm in CDCl_{3}.

== Structure and properties ==
Dimethylphenylphosphine is a pyramidal molecule where the phenyl group and two methyl groups are connected to the phosphorus. The bond length and angles are the following: P-C_{Me}: 1.844, P-C_{Ph}: 1.845 Å, C-C: 1.401 Å, C-H_{Me}: 1.090 Å, C-H_{Ph}: 1.067 Å, C-P-C: 96.9°, C-P-C (ring): 103.4°, P-C-H: 115.2°.

When attached to chiral metal centers, the P-methyl groups are diastereotopic, appearing as separate doublets in the ^{1}H NMR spectrum.

== Comparisons with related phosphine ligands ==
The ν_{CO} of IrCl(CO)(PPh_{3})_{2} and IrCl(CO)(PMe_{2}Ph)_{2} are both at 1960 cm^{−1}, whereas ν_{CO} for IrCl(CO)(PMe_{3})_{2} is at 1938 cm^{−1}.

In terms of basicity, dimethylphenylphosphine is intermediate between that of trialkyl- and triphenylphosphine:

- [HPEt_{3}]^{+} = 8.7
- [HPMe_{2}Ph]^{+} = 6.8
- [HPPh_{3}]^{+} = 2.7

The ligand cone angle (θ) is the apex angle of a cylindrical cone, which is centered 2.28 Å from the center of the P atom. However, the cone angle of an unsymmetrical ligand cannot be determined in the same. In order to determine an effective cone angle for an unsymmetrical ligand PX_{1}X_{2}X_{3}, the following equation is used:

$$\theta = \frac{2}{3}\sum_{i=1}^3 \frac{\theta_i}2$$

Where θ_{i} represent the half angle.

The resulting angles for PMe_{3}, PMe_{2}Ph, PPh_{3} are: PMe_{3} = 118°, PMe_{2}Ph = 122°, PPh_{3} = 145°. Thus, PMe_{2}Ph is intermediate in size relative to PMe_{3} and PPh_{3}.
