= Cyclopentaphosphine =

Names
- IUPAC name pentaphospholane
- Other names Cyclopentaphosphane, pentaphosphole

Identifiers
CAS Number	6798-45-4
3D model (JSmol)	Interactive image
ChemSpider	546991
EC Number	235-633-3
PubChem CID	629880
CompTox Dashboard (EPA)	DTXSID50924646
- InChI: InChI=1S/H5P5/c1-2-4-5-3-1/h1-5H Key: MSVKYECZFNAJJY-UHFFFAOYSA-N
- SMILES: P1PPPP1

Properties
Chemical formula	P_{5}H_{5}
Molar mass	159.909 g/mol
- Except where otherwise noted, data are given for materials in their standard state (at 25 °C [77 °F], 100 kPa). Infobox references

Cyclopentaphosphine is the inorganic compound with the formula (PH)_{5}. It is prepared by the hydrolysis of cyclo-(PSiMe_{3})_{4}. Although only of theoretical interest, (PH)_{5} is parent of many related cyclic polyphosphines that are the subject of research.

== Organic cyclophosphines ==
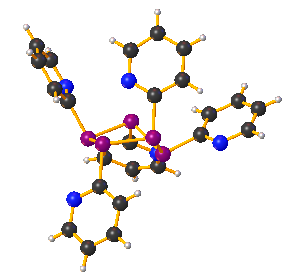
Structure of (2-pyridylP)_{5}. Color code: maroon = P, black = C, white = H, blue = N.

Organic cyclophosphanes are a family of organophosphorus compounds with the formula (RP)_{n} where R is an organic substituent. Many examples are known. They are white, air-sensitive solids which have good solubility in organic solvents. Well-characterized examples are known for ring sizes 3–6. The three-membered rings feature bulky substituents, e.g., [tert-BuP]_{3}.

The cyclophosphines can be prepared by several methods, one involves reductive coupling of dichlorophosphines:

5PhPCl_{2} + 5 Mg → (PhP)_{5} + 5 MgCl_{2}

== Isomerism ==
The structures are complicated by the slow pyramidal inversion at phosphorus(III). In principle, many isomers are possible for cyclo-P_{5}R_{5}, but usually only one is observed. All phenyl substituents are equatorial in cyclo-P_{6}(C_{6}H_{5})_{6}.
