= Phosphine-borane =

Structure of Me_{3}PBH_{3}, a phosphine-borane.

In chemistry, phosphine-boranes are organophosphorus compounds with the formula R_{3−n}H_{n}PBH_{3}. They are Lewis acid-Lewis base adducts derived from organophosphines (PR_{3−n}H_{n}) and borane (BH_{3}). They are generally colorless or white solids. Since these adducts are air-stable, they represent a protected form of the parent organophosphine.

== Formation and decomplexation ==
Typically phosphine-boranes are produced by treating the parent phosphine with a source of borane:

PR_{3−n}H_{n} + BH_{3} → R_{3−n}H_{n}PBH_{3}

Because borane solutions are expensive or dangerous, the borane is often generated in situ, e.g., by oxidation of borohydride with iodine.

Deprotection to liberate the phosphine is often achieved by treatment with a tertiary amine:

R_{3−n}H_{n}PBH_{3} + R'_{3}N → R'_{3}NBH_{3} + R_{3−n}H_{n}P

== See also ==
- Frustrated Lewis pair, where the borane is often tris(pentafluorophenyl)borane
- Ammonia borane, related to phosphine-borane but with ammonia or amines in place of organophosphines
