= Rauhut–Currier reaction =

Chemical reaction

The Rauhut–Currier reaction, also called the vinylogous Morita–Baylis–Hillman reaction, is an organic reaction describing (in its original scope) the dimerization or isomerization of electron-deficient alkenes such as enones by action of an organophosphine of the type R_{3}P. In a more general description the RC reaction is any coupling of one active alkene / latent enolate to a second Michael acceptor, creating a new C–C bond between the alpha-position of one activated alkene and the beta-position of a second alkene under the influence of a nucleophilic catalyst. The reaction mechanism is essentially that of the related and better known Baylis–Hillman reaction (DABCO not phosphine, carbonyl not enone) but the Rauhut–Currier reaction actually predates it by several years. In comparison to the MBH reaction, the RC reaction lacks substrate reactivity and regioselectivity.

The original 1963 reaction described the dimerization of the ethyl acrylate to the ethyl diester of 2-methylene-glutaric acid with tributylphosphine in acetonitrile:

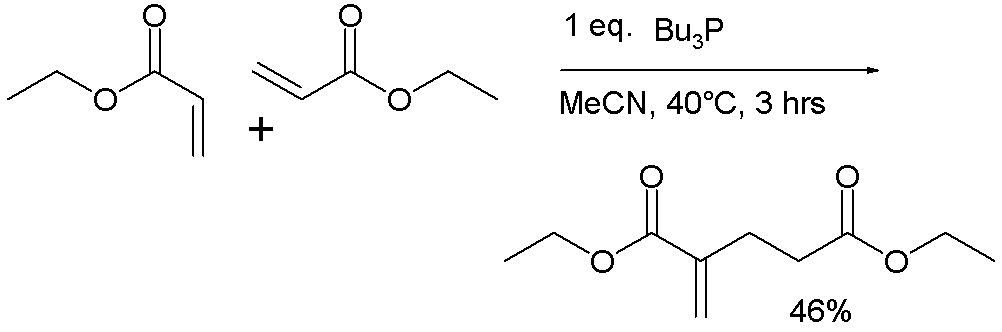
Rauhut–Currier reaction

This reaction was also found to work for acrylonitrile.

RC cross-couplings are known but suffer from lack of selectivity. Amines such as DABCO can also act as catalyst. The reactivity is improved in intramolecular RC reactions, for example in the isomerization of di-enones to form cyclopentenes:

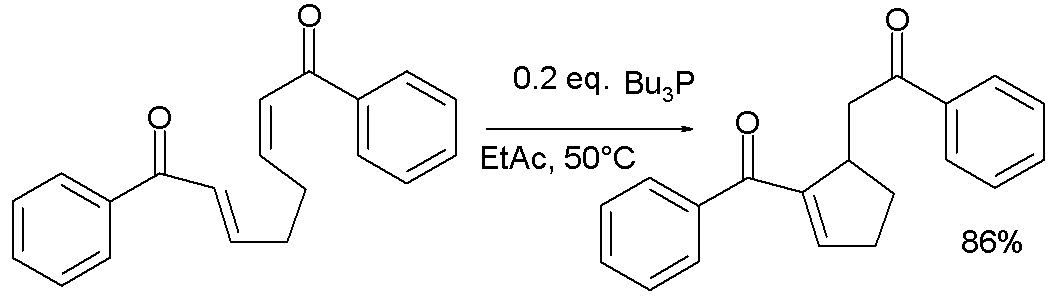
Intramolecular Rauhut–Currier reaction

A similar reaction by asymmetric synthesis organocatalyzed by a protected cysteine and potassium tert-butoxide afforded a cyclohexene with 95% enantiomeric excess:

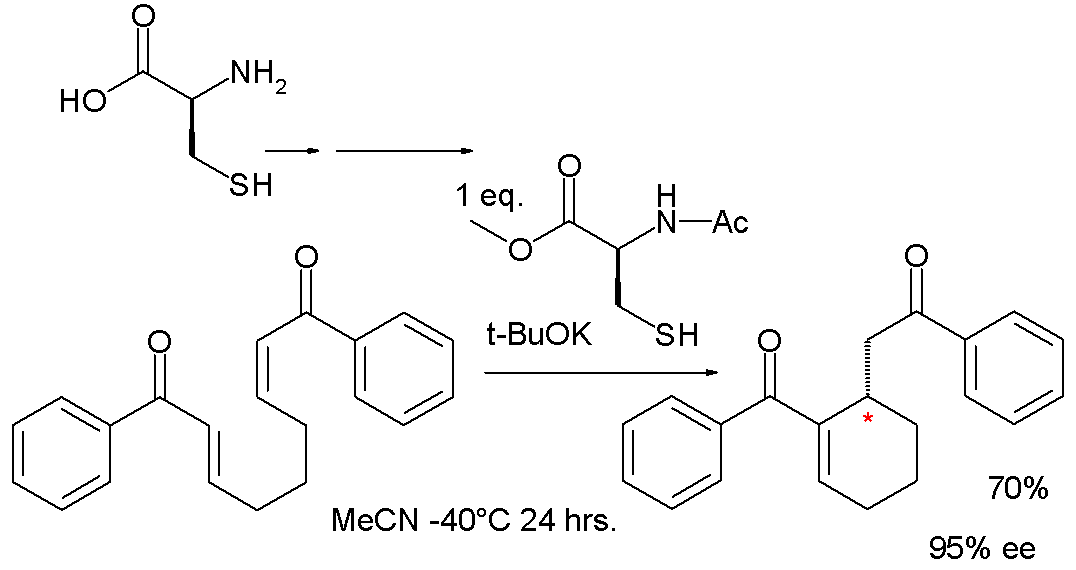
Enantioselective Rauhut–Currier reaction

In this reaction the phosphine is replaced by the thiol group of cysteine but the reaction is the same.
