= Dichlorophenylphosphine =

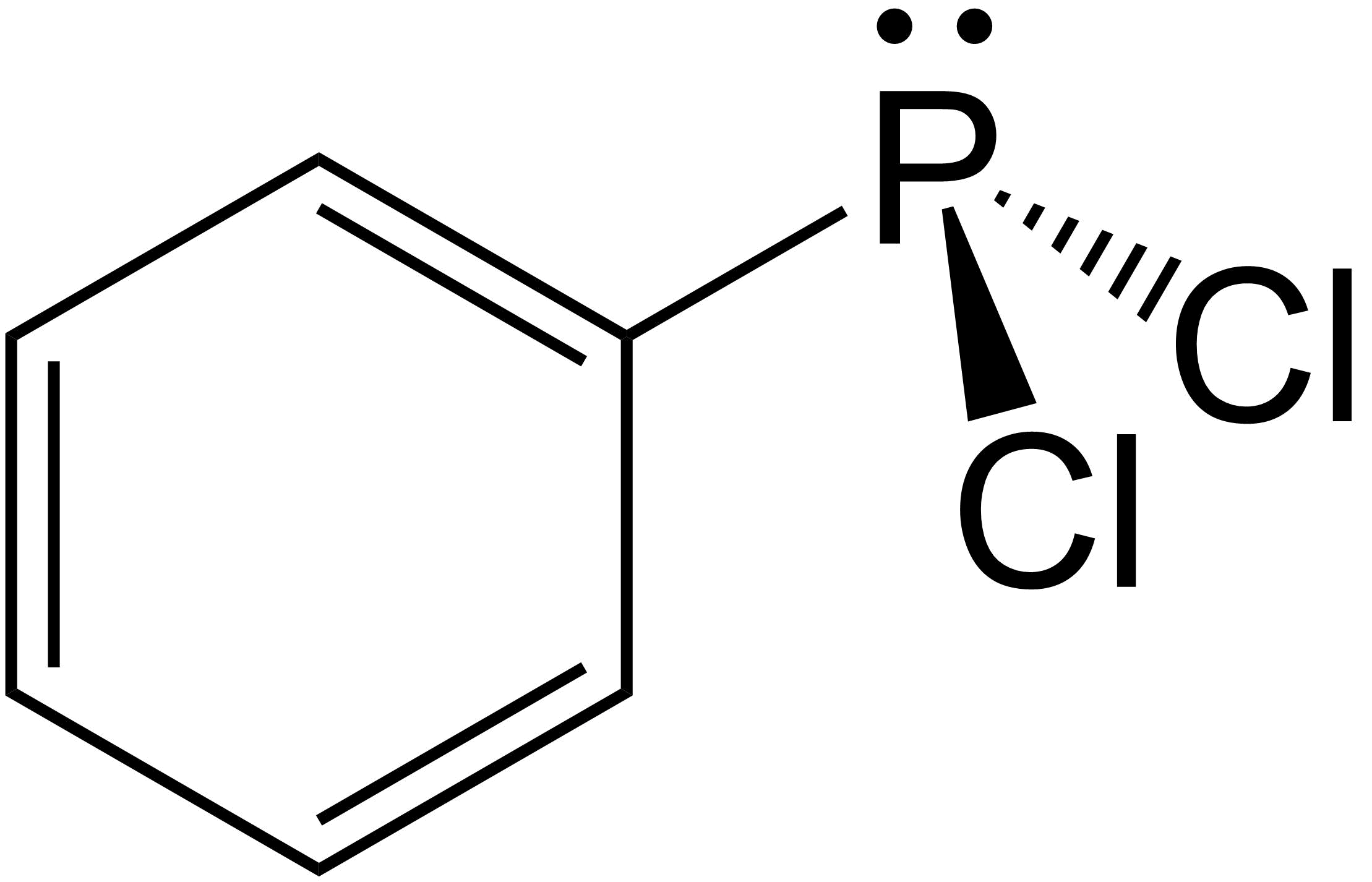

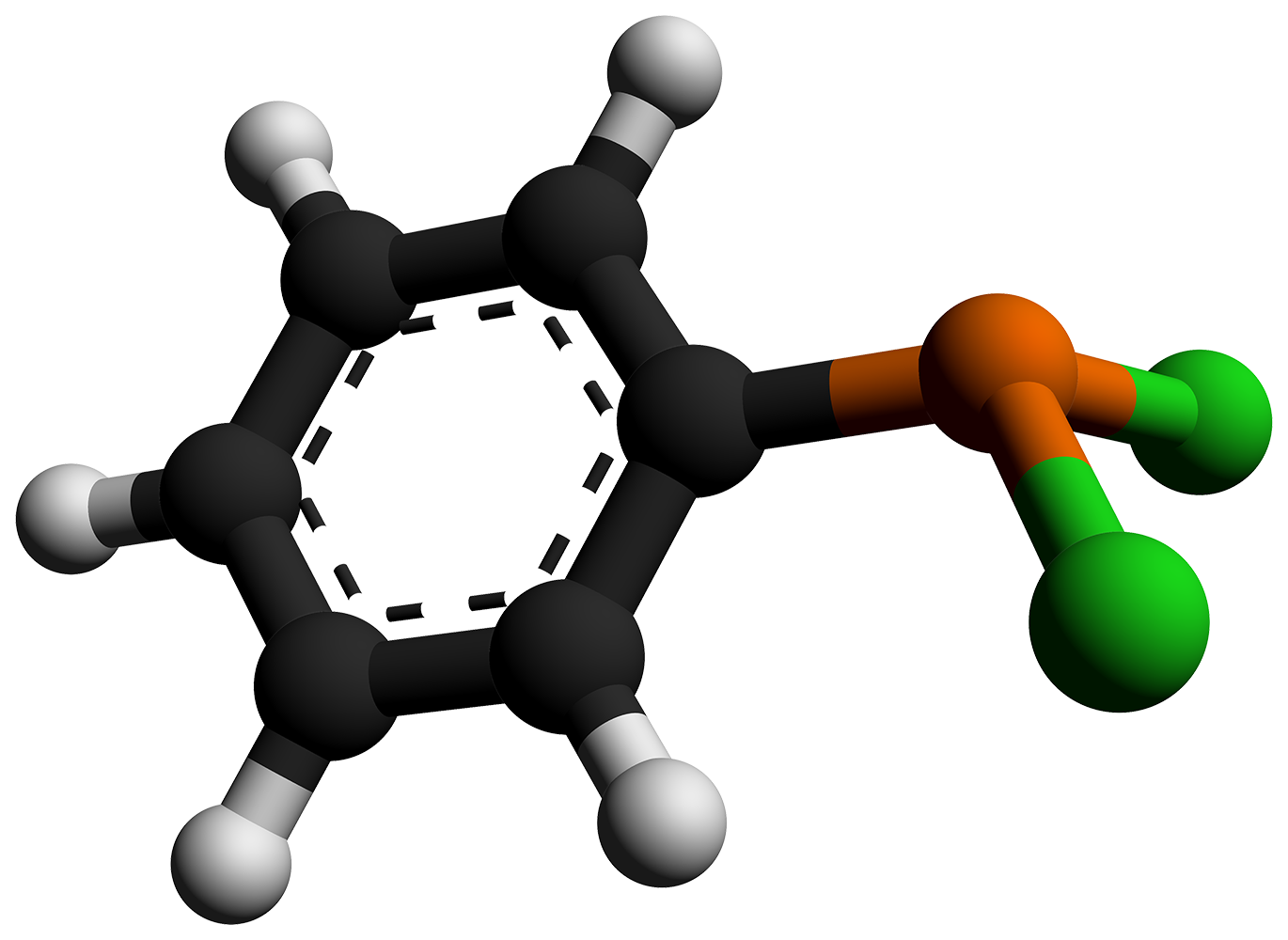

Names
- Preferred IUPAC name Phenylphosphonous dichloride
- Other names Dichlorophenylphosphane; Phenylphosphorus dichloride

Identifiers
CAS Number	644-97-3
3D model (JSmol)	Interactive image
ChEMBL	ChEMBL1899635
ChemSpider	12053
ECHA InfoCard	100.010.388
EC Number	211-425-8
PubChem CID	12573
RTECS number	TB2478000
UNII	WRU258L1EW
UN number	2798
CompTox Dashboard (EPA)	DTXSID4027282
- InChI: InChI=1S/C6H5Cl2P/c7-9(8)6-4-2-1-3-5-6/h1-5H Key: IMDXZWRLUZPMDH-UHFFFAOYSA-N; InChI=1/C6H5Cl2P/c7-9(8)6-4-2-1-3-5-6/h1-5H Key: IMDXZWRLUZPMDH-UHFFFAOYAO
- SMILES: ClP(Cl)c1ccccc1

Properties
Chemical formula	C_{6}H_{5}Cl_{2}P
Molar mass	178.98 g·mol^{−1}
Appearance	colorless liquid
Odor	acrid, pungent
Density	1.3190 g/mL
Melting point	−51 °C (−60 °F; 222 K)
Boiling point	222 °C (432 °F; 495 K)
Solubility in water	insoluble
Solubility	miscible in benzene, CS_{2}, chloroform
Refractive index (n_{D})	1.6030

Hazards
- GHS labelling
Pictograms	(GHS05: Corrosive) (GHS06: Toxic) (GHS07: Exclamation mark)
Signal word	Danger
Hazard statements	H290, H301, H302, H314, H335
Precautionary statements	P234, P260, P264, P270, P271, P280, P301+P310, P301+P312, P301+P330+P331, P303+P361+P353, P304+P340, P305+P351+P338, P310, P312, P321, P330, P363, P390, P403+P233, P404, P405, P501
NFPA 704 (fire diamond)	3 1 3 W
Flash point	101 °C (214 °F; 374 K)
Autoignition temperature	159 °C (318 °F; 432 K)
- Lethal dose or concentration (LD, LC)
LD_{50} (median dose)	200 mg/kg (oral, rat)
Safety data sheet (SDS)	Fisher MSDS
- Except where otherwise noted, data are given for materials in their standard state (at 25 °C [77 °F], 100 kPa). verify (what is ?) Infobox references

Dichlorophenylphosphine is an organophosphorus compound with the formula C_{6}H_{5}PCl_{2}. This colourless viscous liquid is commonly used in the synthesis of organophosphines.

Dichlorophenylphosphine is commercially available. It may be prepared by an electrophilic substitution of benzene by phosphorus trichloride, catalyzed by aluminium chloride. However, aluminum chloride often induces diarylation; a cleaner catalyst for monoarylation is stannic chloride. The compound is an intermediate for the synthesis of other chemicals for instance dimethylphenylphosphine:

C_{6}H_{5}PCl_{2} + 2 CH_{3}MgI → C_{6}H_{5}P(CH_{3})_{2} + 2 MgICl

Many tertiary phosphines can be prepared by this route.

In the McCormack reaction dichlorophenylphosphine adds dienes to give the chlorophospholenium ring.

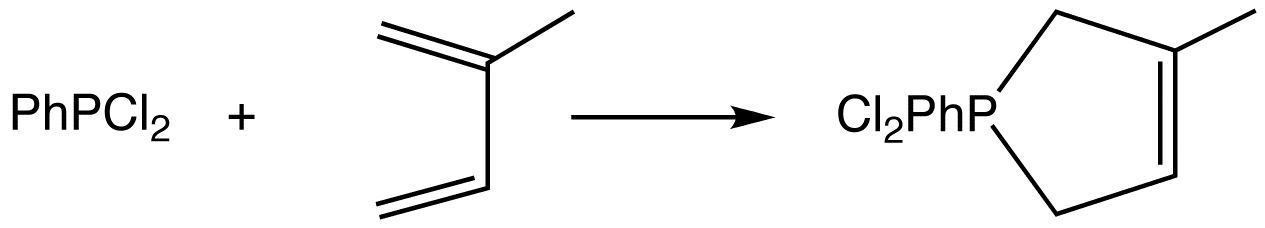

Reductive coupling of the dichlorophosphine gives the cyclophosphine (PhP)_{5}.
