= Phosphonite =

Organic compounds with the formula P(OR)2R

General ester of phosphonous acid

In organic chemistry, phosphonites are organophosphorus compounds with the formula P(OR)_{2}R. They are found in some pesticides and are used as ligands.

== Preparation ==
Although they are derivatives of phosphonous acid (RP(OH)_{2}), they are not prepared from such precursors. Phosphonites are prepared by alcoholysis of organophosphinous chlorides. For example, treatment of dichlorophenylphosphine with methanol and base gives dimethyl phenylphosphonite:

Cl_{2}PPh + 2 CH_{3}OH → (CH_{3}O)_{2}PPh + 2 HCl

== Reactions ==
Oxidation of phosphonites gives phosphonates:

2 P(OR)_{2}R + O_{2} → 2 OP(OR)_{2}R

Phosphonites can function as ligands in homogeneous catalysis.
