= Phosphine oxide =

Chemical compound

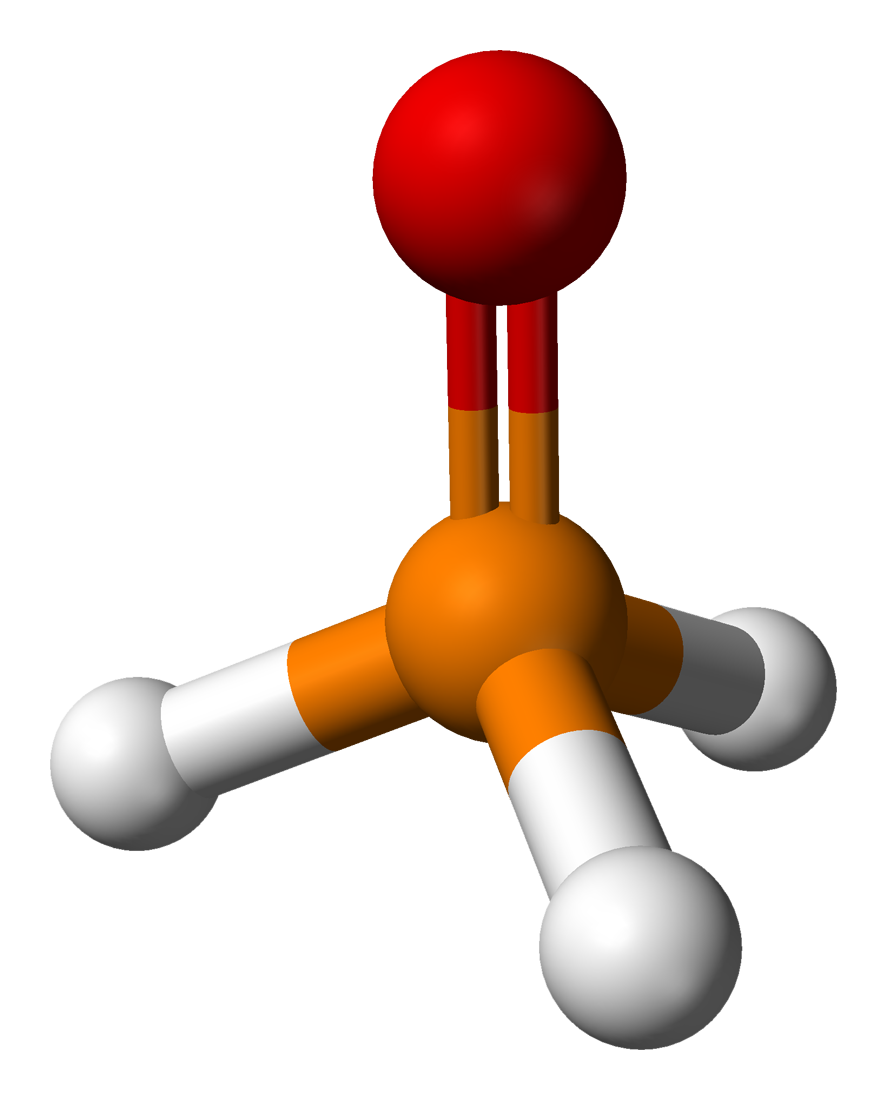

Identifiers
CAS Number	13840-40-9
3D model (JSmol)	Interactive image
PubChem CID	57448882
- InChI: InChI=1S/H3OP/c1-2/h2H3 Key: MPQXHAGKBWFSNV-UHFFFAOYSA-N
- SMILES: [O-][PH3+]

Properties
Chemical formula	H_{3}OP
Molar mass	49.997 g·mol^{−1}
- Except where otherwise noted, data are given for materials in their standard state (at 25 °C [77 °F], 100 kPa). Infobox references

Phosphine oxide is the inorganic compound with the formula H_{3}PO. Although stable as a dilute gas, liquid or solid samples are unstable. Unlike many other compounds of the type PO_{x}H_{y}, H_{3}PO is rarely discussed and is not even mentioned in major sources on main group chemistry.

H_{3}PO has been detected by mass spectrometry as a reaction product of oxygen and phosphine, by means of FT-IR in a phosphine-ozone reaction

== Generation ==
Phosphine oxide has been claimed as the product of a reaction of phosphine with vanadium oxytrichloride as well as with chromyl chloride. The product was obtained by matrix isolation. It has also been reported relatively stable in a water-ethanol solution by electrochemical oxidation of white phosphorus, where it slowly disproportionates into phosphine and hypophosphorous acid.

Phosphine oxide is reported as an intermediate in the room-temperature polymerization of phosphine and nitric oxide to solid P_{x}H_{y}.
