= Organophosphorus chemistry =

Organic compound with at least one covalent carbon–phosphorus bond

Organophosphorus chemistry is the scientific study of the synthesis and properties of organophosphorus compounds, which are organic compounds containing phosphorus. They are used primarily in pest control as an alternative to chlorinated hydrocarbons that persist in the environment. Some organophosphorus compounds are highly effective insecticides, although some are extremely toxic to humans, including sarin and VX nerve agents.

Phosphorus, like nitrogen, is in group 15 of the periodic table, and thus phosphorus compounds and nitrogen compounds have many similar properties. The definition of organophosphorus compounds is variable, which can lead to confusion. In industrial and environmental chemistry, an organophosphorus compound need contain only an organic substituent, but need not have a direct phosphorus-carbon (P−C) bond. Thus a large proportion of pesticides (e.g., malathion), are often included in this class of compounds.

Phosphorus can adopt a variety of oxidation states, and it is general to classify organophosphorus compounds based on their being derivatives of phosphorus(V) vs phosphorus(III), which are the predominant classes of compounds. In a descriptive but only intermittently used nomenclature, phosphorus compounds are identified by their coordination number σ and their valency λ. In this system, a phosphine is a σ^{3}λ^{3} compound.

== Organophosphorus(V) compounds, main categories ==
=== Phosphate esters and amides ===
Phosphate esters have the general structure P(=O)(OR)_{3} feature P(V). Such species are of technological importance as flame retardant agents, and plasticizers. Lacking a P−C bond, these compounds are in the technical sense not organophosphorus compounds but esters of phosphoric acid. Many derivatives are found in nature, such as phosphatidylcholine. Phosphate ester are synthesized by alcoholysis of phosphorus oxychloride. A variety of mixed amido-alkoxo derivatives are known, one medically significant example being the anti-cancer drug cyclophosphamide. Also derivatives containing the thiophosphoryl group (P=S) include the pesticide malathion. The organophosphates prepared on the largest scale are the zinc dithiophosphates, as additives for motor oil. Several million kilograms of this coordination complex are produced annually by the reaction of phosphorus pentasulfide with alcohols.

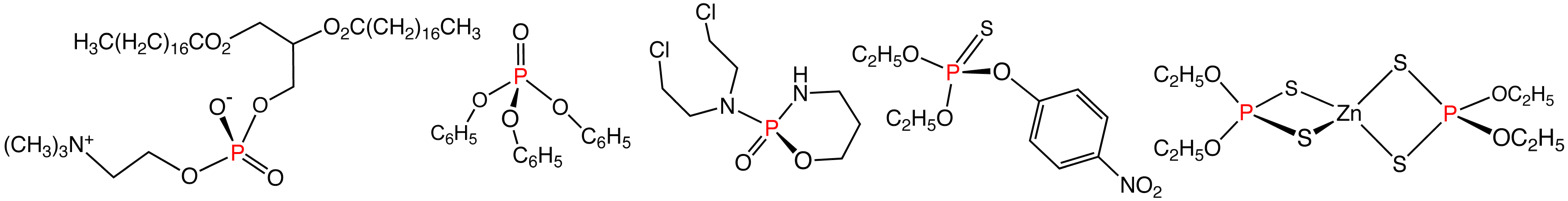
Illustrative organophosphates and related compounds: phosphatidylcholine, triphenylphosphate, cyclophosphamide, parathion, and zinc dithiophosphate.

Phosphoryl thioates are thermodynamically much stabler than thiophosphates, which can rearrange at high temperature or with a catalytic alkylant to the former:

SP(OR)_{3} → OP(OR)_{2}SR

In the environment, all these phosphorus(V) compounds break down via hydrolysis to eventually afford phosphate and the organic alcohol or amine from which they are derived.

=== Phosphonic and phosphinic acids and their esters ===
Phosphonates are esters of phosphonic acid and have the general formula RP(=O)(OR')_{2}. Phosphonates have many technical applications, a well-known member being glyphosate, better known as Roundup. With the formula (HO)_{2}P(O)CH_{2}NHCH_{2}CO_{2}H, this derivative of glycine is one of the most widely used herbicides. Bisphosphonates are a class of drugs to treat osteoporosis. The nerve gas agent sarin, containing both C–P and F–P bonds, is a phosphonate.

Phosphinates feature two P–C bonds, with the general formula R_{2}P(=O)(OR'). A commercially significant member is the herbicide glufosinate. Similar to glyphosate mentioned above, it has the structure CH_{3}P(O)(OH)CH_{2}CH_{2}CH(NH_{2})CO_{2}H.

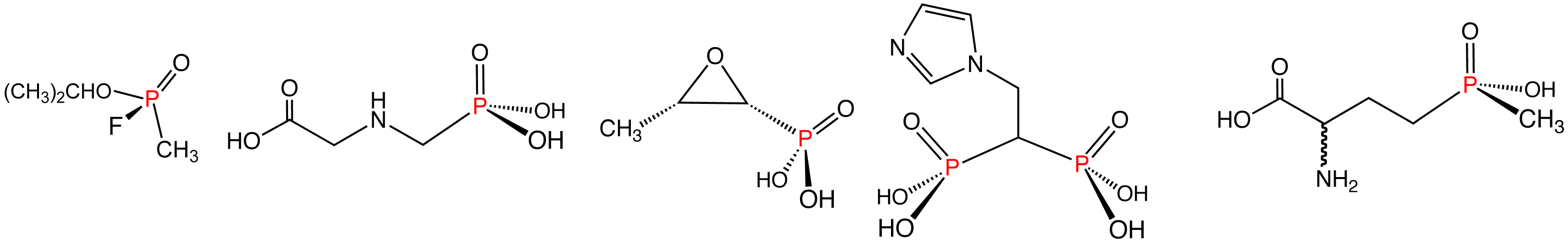
Illustrative examples of phosphonates and phosphinates in the order shown: Sarin (phosphonate), Glyphosate (phosphonate), fosfomycin (phosphonate), zoledronic acid (phosphonate), and Glufosinate (phosphinate). In aqueous solution, phosphonic acids ionize to give the corresponding organophosphonates.

The Michaelis–Arbuzov reaction is the main method for the synthesis of these compounds. For example, dimethylmethylphosphonate (see figure above) arises from the rearrangement of trimethylphosphite, which is catalyzed by methyl iodide. In the Horner–Wadsworth–Emmons reaction and the Seyferth–Gilbert homologation, phosphonates are used in reactions with carbonyl compounds. The Kabachnik–Fields reaction is a method for the preparation of aminophosphonates. These compounds contain a very inert bond between phosphorus and carbon. Consequently, they hydrolyze to give phosphonic and phosphinic acid derivatives, but not phosphate.

=== Phosphine oxides, imides, and chalcogenides ===
Phosphine oxides (designation σ^{4}λ^{5}) have the general structure R_{3}P=O with formal oxidation state +5. Phosphine oxides form hydrogen bonds and some are therefore soluble in water. The P=O bond is very polar with a dipole moment of 4.51 D for triphenylphosphine oxide.

Compounds related to phosphine oxides include phosphine imides (R_{3}PNR') and related chalcogenides (R_{3}PE, where E = S, Se, Te). These compounds are some of the most thermally stable organophosphorus compounds. In general, they are less basic than the corresponding phosphine oxides, which can adduce to thiophosphoryl halides:

R_{3}PO + X_{3}PS → R_{3}P^{+}–O–P^{+}X_{2}–S^{−} + X^{−}

Some phosphorus sulfides can undergo a reverse Arbuzov rearrangement to a dialkylthiophosphinate ester.

Phosphorus selenides are susceptible to further alkylation on the selenium atom.

=== Phosphonium salts and phosphoranes ===
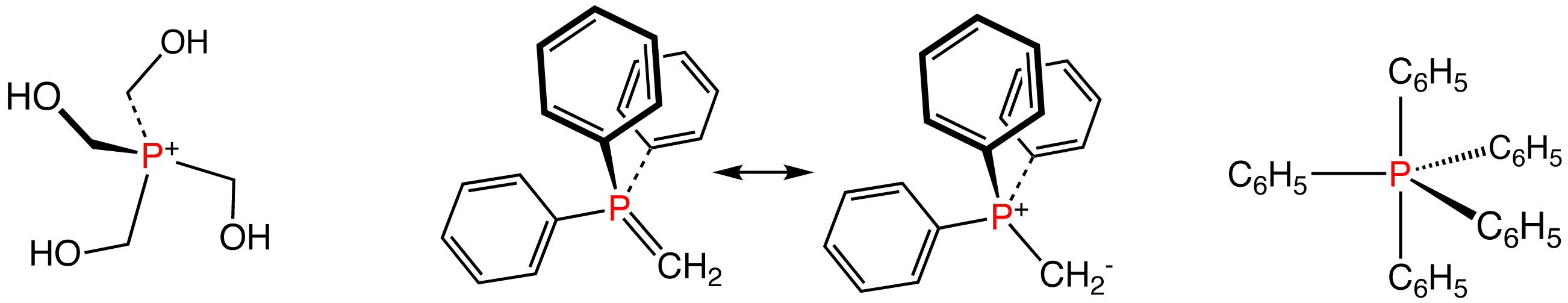
Illustrative phosphorus(V) compounds: the phosphonium ion P(CH_{2}OH)_{4}^{+}, two resonance structures for the Wittig reagent Ph_{3}PCH_{2}, and pentaphenylphosphorane, a rare pentaorganophophorus compound.

Compounds with the formula [PR_{4}^{+}]X^{−} comprise the phosphonium salts. These species are tetrahedral phosphorus(V) compounds. From the commercial perspective, the most important member is tetrakis(hydroxymethyl)phosphonium chloride, [P(CH_{2}OH)_{4}]Cl, which is used as a fire retardant in textiles. Approximately 2 Gg are produced annually of the chloride and the related sulfate. They are generated by the reaction of phosphine with formaldehyde in the presence of the mineral acid:

PH_{3} + HX + 4 CH_{2}O → [P(CH_{2}OH)_{4}^{+}]X^{−}

A variety of phosphonium salts can be prepared by alkylation and arylation of organophosphines:

PR_{3} + R'X → [PR_{3}R'^{+}]X^{−}

Phosphoranes (σ^{5}λ^{5}) are formally derived from the unknown PH_{5}. Those with five organic substituents are rare, although P(C_{6}H_{5})_{5} is the product of P(C_{6}H_{5})_{4}^{+} and phenyllithium. Related compounds containing both halide and organic substituents on phosphorus are fairly common.

Phosphorus ylides are unsaturated phosphoranes, known as Wittig reagents, e.g. CH_{2}P(C_{6}H_{5})_{3}. These compounds feature tetrahedral phosphorus(V) and are related to phosphine oxides. They too are derived from phosphonium salts; Wittig's original preparation begins by methylating triphenylphosphine. But Wittig reagent synthesis proceeds to deprotonation, not a second alkylation.

== Organophosphorus(III) compounds, main categories ==
=== Phosphites, phosphonites, and phosphinites ===
Phosphites, sometimes called phosphite esters, have the general structure P(OR)_{3} with oxidation state +3. Such species arise from the alcoholysis of phosphorus trichloride:

PCl_{3} + 3 ROH → P(OR)_{3} + 3 HCl

The reaction is general, thus a vast number of such species are known. Phosphites are employed in the Perkow reaction and the Michaelis–Arbuzov reaction. They also serve as ligands in organometallic chemistry.

Intermediate between phosphites and phosphines are phosphonites (P(OR)_{2}R') and phosphinite (P(OR)R'_{2}). Such species arise via alcoholysis reactions of the corresponding phosphonous and phosphinous chlorides ((PCl_{2}R') and (PClR'_{2}), respectively). The latter are produced by reaction of a phosphorus trichloride with a poor metal-alkyl complex, e.g. organomercury, organolead, or a mixed lithium-organoaluminum compound.

=== Phosphines ===
The parent compound of the phosphines is PH_{3}, called phosphine in the US and British Commonwealth, but phosphane elsewhere. Replacement of one or more hydrogen centers by an organic substituents (alkyl, aryl), gives PH_{3−x}R_{x}, an organophosphine, generally referred to as phosphines.

From the commercial perspective, the most important phosphine is triphenylphosphine, several million kilograms being produced annually. It is prepared from the reaction of chlorobenzene, PCl_{3}, and sodium. Phosphines of a more specialized nature are usually prepared by other routes. Phosphorus halides undergo nucleophilic displacement by organometallic reagents such as Grignard reagents. Organophosphines are nucleophiles and ligands. Two major applications are as reagents in the Wittig reaction and as supporting phosphine ligands in homogeneous catalysis.

Their nucleophilicity is evidenced by their reactions with alkyl halides to give phosphonium salts. Phosphines are nucleophilic catalysts in organic synthesis, e.g. the Rauhut–Currier reaction and Baylis-Hillman reaction. Where the nucleophilicity or basicity of organophosphines causes trouble, they can be protected as phosphine-boranes.

Phosphines are also reducing agents, as illustrated in the Staudinger reduction for the conversion of organic azides to amines and in the Mitsunobu reaction for converting alcohols into esters. In these processes, the phosphine is oxidized to phosphorus(V). Phosphines have also been found to reduce activated carbonyl groups, for instance the reduction of an α-keto ester to an α-hydroxy ester.

A few halophosphines are known, although phosphorus' strong nucleophilicity predisposes them to decomposition, and dimethylphosphinyl fluoride spontaneously disproportionates to dimethylphosphine trifluoride and tetramethylbiphosphine. One common synthesis adds halogens to tetramethylbiphosphine disulfide. Alternatively alkylation of phosphorus trichloride gives a halophosphonium cation, which metals reduce to halophosphines.

=== Phosphaalkenes and phosphaalkynes ===
Compounds with carbon phosphorus(III) multiple bonds are called phosphaalkenes (R_{2}C=PR) and phosphaalkynes (RC≡P). They are similar in structure, but not in reactivity, to imines (R_{2}C=NR) and nitriles (RC≡N), respectively. In the compound phosphorine, one carbon atom in benzene is replaced by phosphorus. Species of this type are relatively rare but for that reason are of interest to researchers. A general method for the synthesis of phosphaalkenes is by 1,2-elimination of suitable precursors, initiated thermally or by base such as DBU, DABCO, or triethylamine:

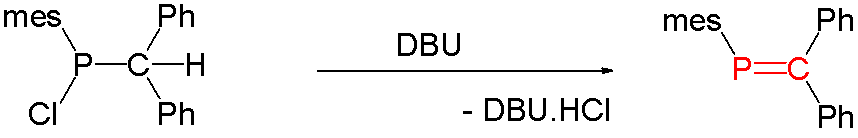

Thermolysis of Me_{2}PH generates CH_{2}=PMe, an unstable species in the condensed phase.

== Organophosphorus(0), (I), and (II) compounds ==
Compounds where phosphorus exists in a formal oxidation state of less than III are uncommon, but examples are known for each class. Organophosphorus(0) species are debatably illustrated by the carbene adducts, [P(NHC)]_{2}, where NHC is an N-heterocyclic carbene. With the formulae (RP)_{n} and (R_{2}P)_{2}, respectively, compounds of phosphorus(I) and (II) are generated by reduction of the related organophosphorus(III) chlorides:

5 PhPCl_{2} + 5 Mg → (PhP)_{5} + 5 MgCl_{2}
2 Ph_{2}PCl + Mg → Ph_{2}P-PPh_{2} + MgCl_{2}

Diphosphenes, with the formula R_{2}P_{2}, formally contain phosphorus-phosphorus double bonds. These phosphorus(I) species are rare but are stable provided that the organic substituents are large enough to prevent catenation. Bulky substituents also stabilize phosphorus radicals.

Many mixed-valence compounds are known, e.g. the cage P_{7}(CH_{3})_{3}.

== See also ==
- Activity-based proteomics—A branch of biochemistry that often relies on organophosphorus probes to interrogate enzyme activities
- Bihar school meal poisoning incident
- Organophosphates
- Organophosphites
- Organothiophosphates
