= Hydrophosphination =

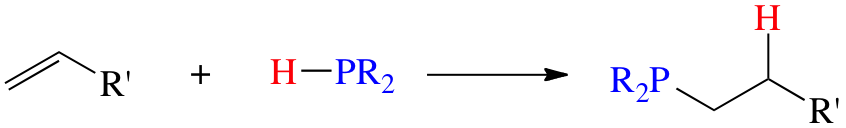
Hydrophosphination of an alkene

Hydrophosphination is the insertion of a double bond into a phosphorus–hydrogen bond. Often the hydrophosphination makes phosphorus–carbon bonds by addition of P–H bonds to carbon–carbon multiple bonds, but the reaction is probably most useful in reactions of phosphine with formaldehyde, a form of hydroxymethylation.

Like other hydrofunctionalizations, the rate and regiochemistry of the insertion reaction is influenced by the catalyst. Catalysts take many forms, but most prevalent are bases and free-radical initiators. Most hydrophosphinations involve reactions of phosphine (PH3).

== Hydroxyalkylation ==
Although most of this article concerns addition of P–H bonds to alkenes, an important variant is the hydrophosphination of formaldehyde. Tetrakis(hydroxymethyl)phosphonium chloride (THPC) is prepared as follows from phosphine:

PH_{3} + 4 H_{2}C=O + HCl → [P(CH_{2}OH)_{4}]Cl

It is a white water-soluble salt with applications as a precursor to fire-retardant materials and as a microbiocide in commercial and industrial water systems. The hydroxymethyl groups on THPC undergo replacement reactions when THPC is treated with α,β-unsaturated nitrile, acid, amide, and epoxides. For example, base induces condensation between THPC and acrylamide with displacement of the hydroxymethyl groups. (Z = CONH_{2})

[P(CH_{2}OH)_{4}]Cl + NaOH + 3 CH_{2}=CHZ → P(CH_{2}CH_{2}Z)_{3} + 4 CH_{2}O + H_{2}O + NaCl

Similar reactions occur when THPC is treated with acrylic acid; only one hydroxymethyl group is displaced, however.

THPC converts to tris(hydroxymethyl)phosphine upon treatment with aqueous sodium hydroxide:

[P(CH_{2}OH)_{4}]Cl + NaOH → P(CH_{2}OH)_{3} + H_{2}O + H_{2}C=O + NaCl

== Acid–base routes ==
The usual application of hydrophosphination involves reactions of phosphine (PH_{3}). Typically base-catalysis allows addition of Michael acceptors such as acrylonitrile to give tris(cyanoethyl)phosphine:

PH_{3} + 3 CH_{2}=CHZ → P(CH_{2}CH_{2}Z)_{3} (Z = NO_{2}, CN, C(O)NH_{2})

Acid catalysis is applicable to hydrophosphination with alkenes that form stable carbocations. These alkenes include isobutylene and many analogues:

PH_{3} + R_{2}C=CH_{2} → R_{2}(CH_{3})CPH_{2} (R = Me, alkyl, etc)

Bases catalyze the addition of secondary phosphines to vinyldiphenylphosphine:

HPR_{2} + CH_{2}=CHPR'_{2} → R_{2}PCH_{2}CH_{2}PR'_{2}

== Free-radical methods ==
Many hydrophosphination reactions are initiated by free-radicals. AIBN and peroxides are typical initiators, as well as Ultraviolet irradiation. In this way, the commercially important tributylphosphine and trioctylphosphine are prepared in good yields from 1-butene and 1-octene, respectively.

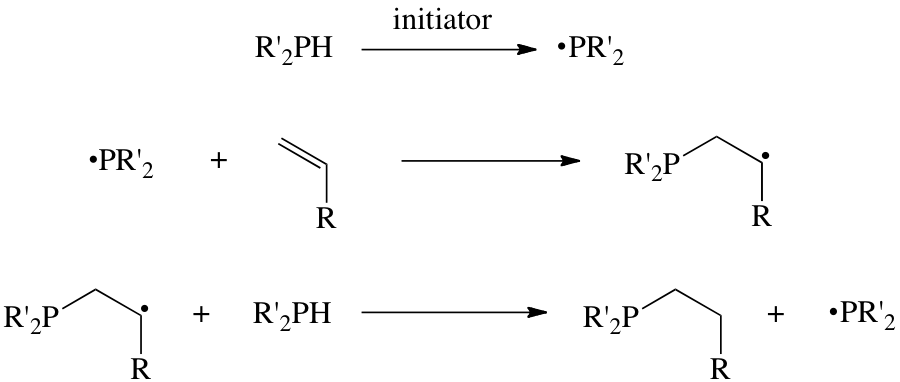
Radical hydrophosphination

The reactions proceed by abstraction of an H atom the phosphine precursor, producing the phosphino radical, a seven electron species. This radical then adds to the alkene, and subsequent H-atom transfer completes the cycle. Some highly efficient hydrophosphinations appear not to proceed via radicals, but alternative explanations are lacking.

== Metal-catalyzed reactions ==
Metal-catalyzed hydrophosphinations are not widely used, although they have been extensively researched. Studies mainly focus on secondary and primary organophosphines (R_{2}PH and RPH_{2}, respectively). These substrates bind to metals, and the resulting adducts insert alkenes and alkynes into the P–H bonds via diverse mechanisms.

=== Early transition metal and lanthanide catalysts ===
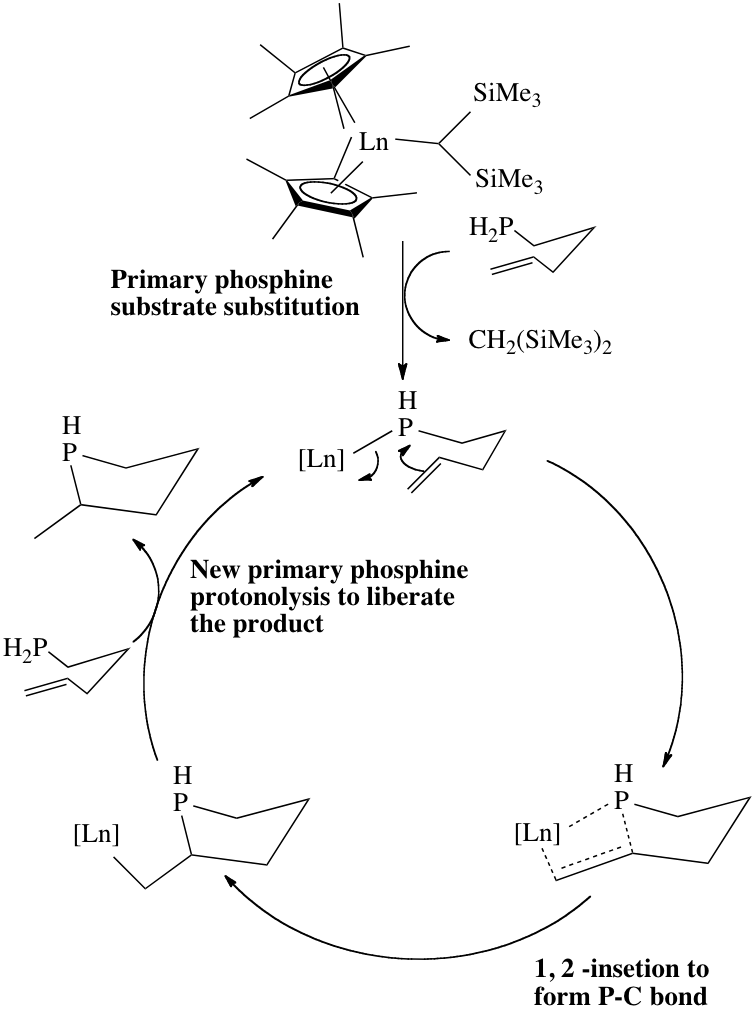
Mechanism proposed for intramolecular hydrophosphination of α, ω-pentenylphosphine catalyzed by lanthanocenes

Metal complexes of d^{0} configurations are effective catalysts for hydrophosphinations of simple alkenes and alkynes. Intramolecular reactions are facile, e.g. starting with α,ω-pentenylphosphine. The primary phosphine undergoes a σ-bond metathesis with the bis(trimethylsilyl)methylene ligand forming the lanthanide-phosphido complex. Subsequently, the pendant terminal alkene or alkyne inserts into the Ln-P bond. Finally, protonolysis of the Ln–C bond with the starting primary phosphine releases the new phosphine and regenerates the catalyst. Given that the metal is electron-poor, the M–C bond is sufficiently enough to be protonolyzed by the substrate primary phosphine.

Most metal catalyzed hydrophosphinations proceed via metal phosphido intermediates. Some however proceed by metal-phosphinidene intermediates, i.e. species with M=PR double bonds. One such example is the Ti-catalyzed hydrophosphination of diphenylacetylene with phenylphosphine. This system involves a cationic catalyst precursor that is stabilized by the bulky 2,4,6-tri(isopropyl)phenyl- substituent on the phosphinidene and the close ionic association of methyltris(pentafluorophenyl)borate. This precursor undergoes exchange with phenylphosphine to give the titanium-phenylphosphinidene complex, which is the catalyst. The Ti=PPh species undergoes a [2+2] cycloaddition with diphenylacetylene to make the corresponding metallacyclobutene. The substrate, phenylphosphine, protonolyzes the Ti–C bond and after a proton shift regenerates the catalyst and releases the new phosphine.

Titanium-catalyzed 1,4-hydrophosphination of 1,3-dienes with diphenylphosphine has been demonstrated. It is a rare example of a d^{2} catalyst. In the first step, the Ti(II) precursor inserted in the P–H bond of diphenylphosphine (Ph_{2}PH).

=== Late transition metal catalysts ===
Late transition metal hydrophosphination catalysts, i.e. those reliant on the nickel-triad and neighboring elements, generally require alkenes and alkynes with electron withdrawing substituents. A strong base is required as a cocatalyst.

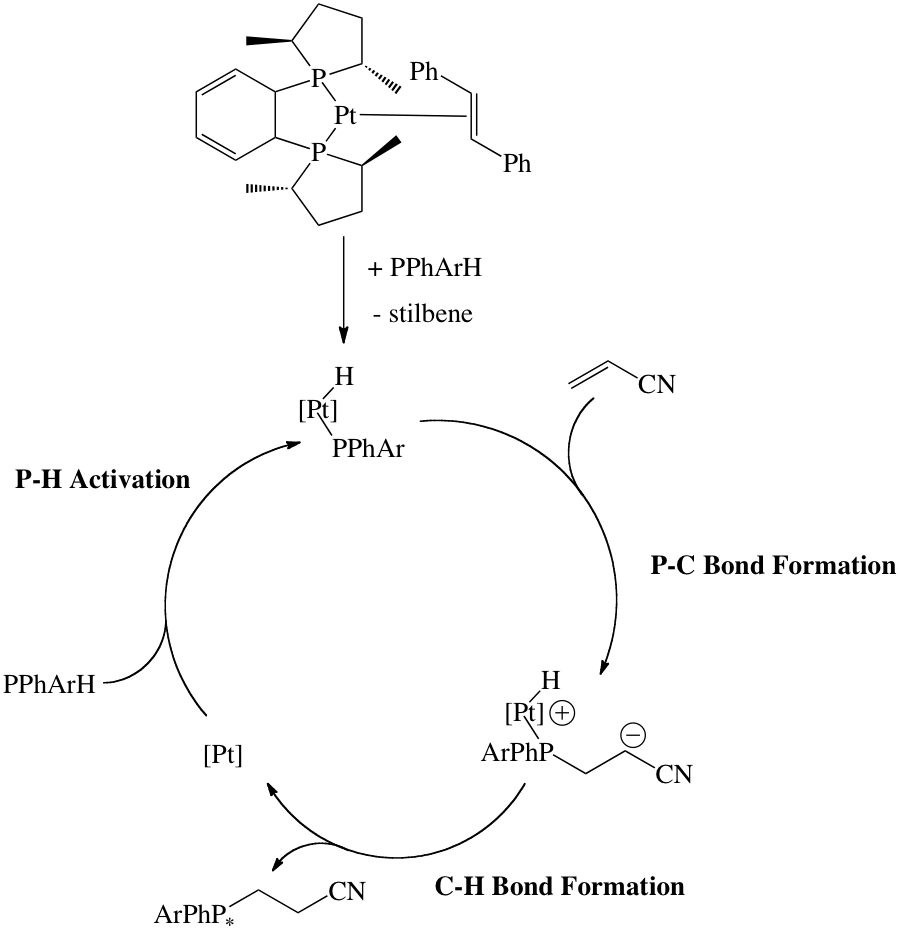
Mechanism proposed for hydrophosphination catalyzed by a Pt(II) phosphido complex

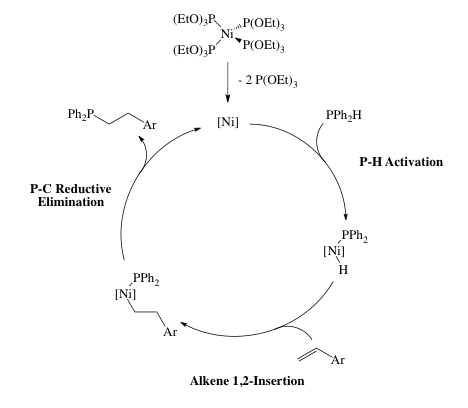
Mechanism proposed for hydrophosphination catalyzed by a Ni(0) catalyst

Some late metal hydrophosphination catalysts proceed via oxidative addition of a P–H bond. For example, a Pt(0) catalyst undergoes oxidative addition of a secondary phosphine to form the corresponding hydrido Pt(II) phosphido complex. These systems catalyze hydrophosphination of acrylonitrile, although this reaction can be achieved without metal catalysts. The key P–C bond-forming step occurs through an outer-sphere, Michael-type addition.

The usual mechanism for hydrophosphination for late metal catalysts involves insertion of the alkene into the metal-phosphorus bond. Insertion into the metal-hydrogen bond is also possible. The product phosphine is produced through reductive elimination of a P–C bond rather than a P–H bond in Glueck's system. The Ni(0) catalyst involves oxidation addition of a P–H bond to the metal, followed by insertion of the alkene into the M–H bond.

=== Main group catalysis ===
Calcium-catalysed intermolecular hydrophosphination is known, using a β-diketiminato complex.

== Hydrophosphorylation and related reactions ==
Utilizing phosphorus(V) precursors hydrophosphorylation entails the insertion of alkenes and alkynes into the P–H bonds of secondary phosphine oxides:

R_{2}P(O)H + CH_{2}=CHR → R_{2}P(O)CH_{2}CH_{2}R

The reaction can be effected both using metal catalysts or free-radical initiators.
