= Phosphinoimidate =

Anions of phosphine imides

Phosphinoimidates, also known as phophinimides, are the anions derived from phosphine imides with the structure [R_{3}P=N]^{−} (R = alkyl or aryl). Phosphinimide ligands are used to for transition metal complexes that are highly active catalysts in some olefin polymerization reactions.

== Synthesis of phosphinoimidate complexes ==
Although phosphinoimidates are formally anions, salts of the anions are typically unavailable owing to their high basicity. Instead the ligand is installed indirectly.

=== Staudinger reaction ===
Preparation of phosphinoimidate complexes are achieved in high yield from the corresponding silyl derivatives R_{3}PNSiMe_{3} (Me = -CH_{3}). These derivatives are prepared by oxidation of phosphine ligands with trimethylsilyl azide, also known as the Staudinger reaction:

PR_{3} + Me_{3}SiN_{3} → Me_{3}SiN=PR_{3} + N_{2}

Starting from these silyl compounds, a variety of phosphinoimidate complexes can be prepared. For example, reaction of dirhenium heptoxide with (N-trimethylsilyl) triphenylphosphoraneimine yields the monomeric phosphoraneiminato complex [ReO_{3}(NPPh_{3})] and hexamethylsiloxane:

Re_{2}O_{7} + 2 Me_{3}SiNPPh_{3} → 2 [ReO_{3}(NPPh_{3})] + O(SiMe_{3})_{2}

=== Syntheses from nitrido complexes ===
The first phosphinoimidate complexes were prepared by reaction of phosphines with molybdenum and tungsten nitrido complexes:

MNCl_{3} + PPh_{3} → M(NPPh_{3})Cl_{3}

This reaction is accompanied by reduction of the metal from +VI to +IV and phosphorus from (III) to (V). The main limitation of this reaction is the relative rarity of metal nitride complexes.

== Molecular structure ==
Phosphinoimidate complexes of transition metals containing the [R_{3}P=N]^{−} ligand are known to adopt several bonding modes. In complexes with metal ions in low oxidation states (+I, +II), the [R_{3}P=N]^{−} group often serves as a μ_{3}-N bridging ligand. For complexes of intermediate oxidation states (+III, +IV), the [R_{3}P=N]^{−} ligand bridges pairs of metals. For metals in high oxidation states (+V to +VIII), the [R_{3}P=N]^{−} group exists exclusively as the terminal ligand. Most phosphinoimidate complexes fall into two groups, one with a linear or largely linear M-N-P bridge with bond angles between 161 and 177° and another with a bent M-N-P configuration with bond angles between 130 and 140°. Linear M-N-P arrangements are achieved mainly by metals in high oxidation states while metals with lower oxidation states are characterized by bent M-N-P arrangements.

== Bonding (Resonance structures) ==
L_{n}M^{−}=N^{+}=PR_{3} ↔ L_{n}M^{−}=N—P^{+}R_{3} ↔ L_{n}M—N=PR_{3}

== Applications ==
One family of titanium phosphinoimidates has been commercialized as catalysts for ethylene polymerization. Cyclopentadienyl-titanium-phosphinoimidate compounds with the general formula CpTiCl_{2}(NPR_{3}) are effective catalysts in the presence of methyl alumoxane (MAO), while those with the general formula CpTiMe_{2}(NPR_{3}) are effective in the presence of trityl tetrakis(pentafluorophenyl)borate (TB).

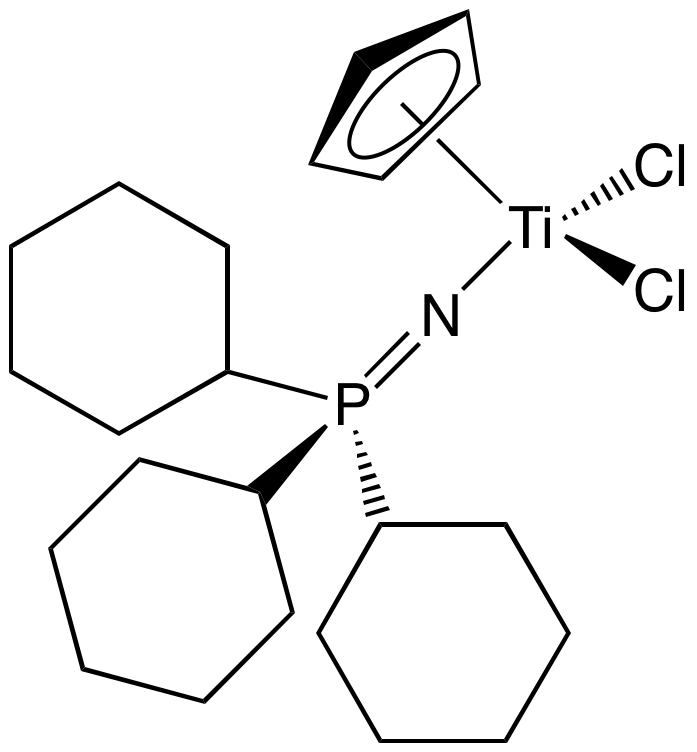
CpTiCl_{2}(NPCy_{3}) (Cy = cyclohexyl)

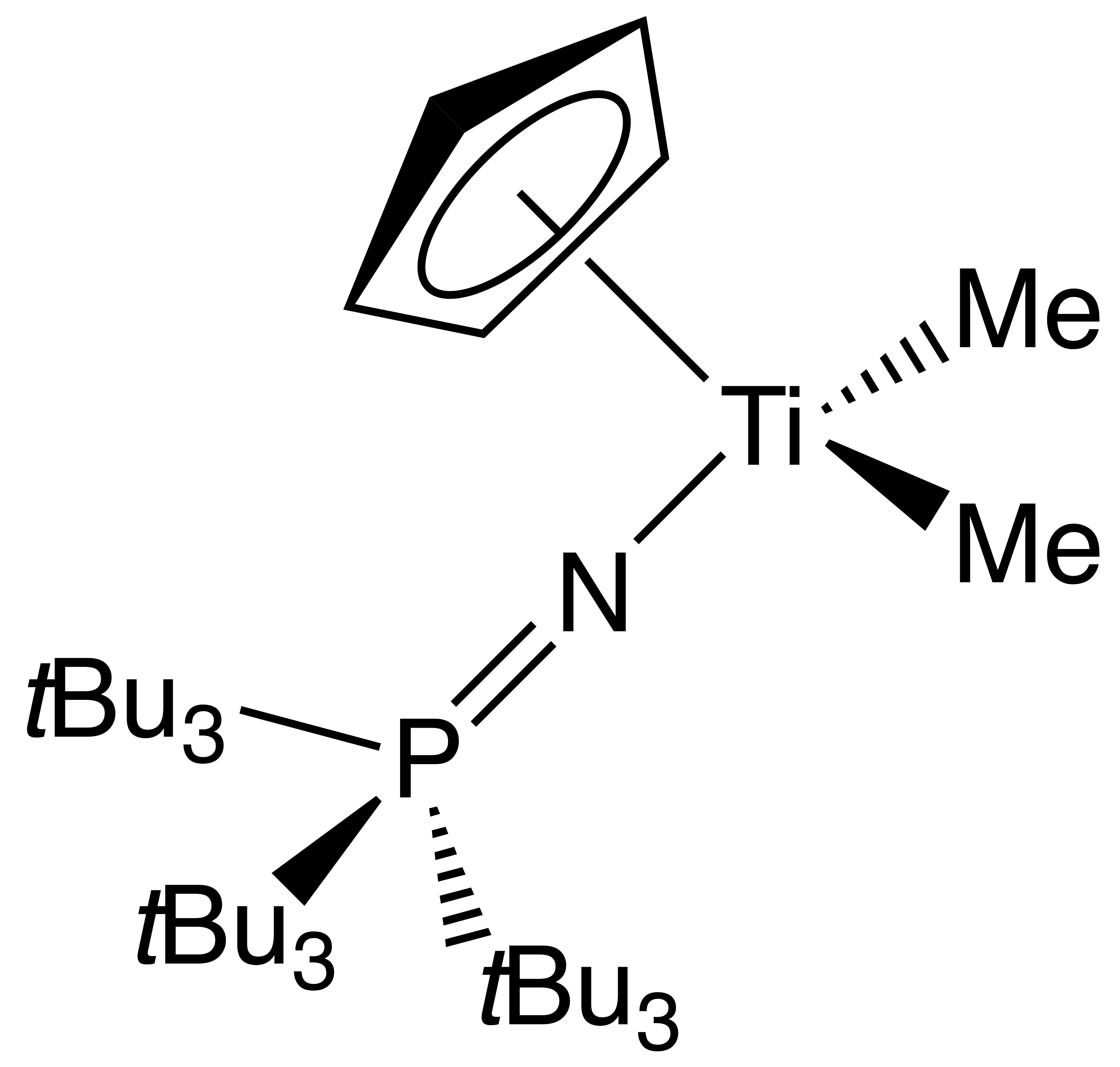
CpTiMe_{2}(NPtBu_{3})
