= Aza-Wittig reaction =

Chemical coupling reaction

The Aza-Wittig reaction or is a chemical reaction of a carbonyl group with an aza-ylide, also known as an iminophosphorane (R_{3}P=NR'). Aza-Wittig reactions are most commonly used to convert aldehydes and ketones to the corresponding imines. The conversion has also been practiced in an intramolecular sense, which is commonly used in the synthesis of N-heterocyclic compounds. The Aza-Wittig reaction is known also for transition metal carbonyl complexes.

== Reaction mechanism ==
The mechanism of the aza-Wittig reaction is analogous to that of the Wittig reaction, with the Wittig reagent replaced by an iminophosphorane.

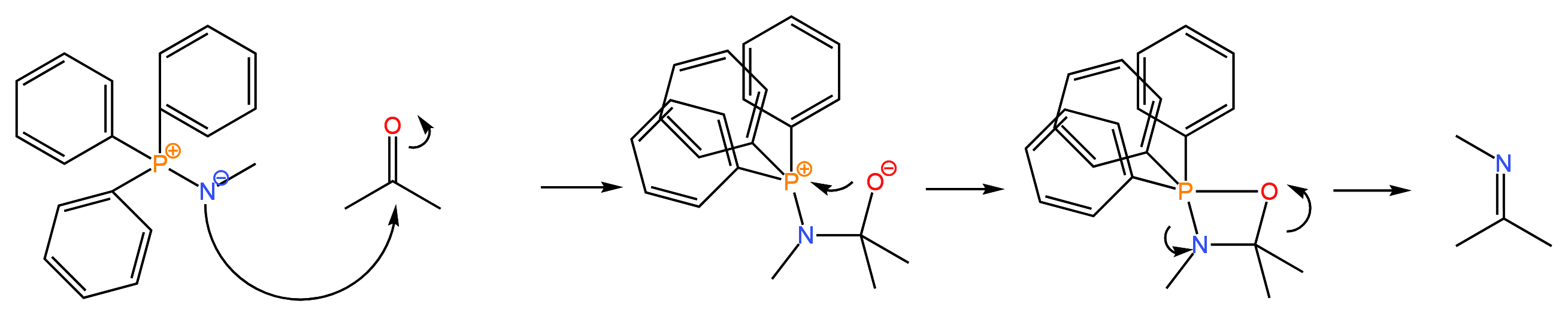
Mechanism of Aza-Wittig-reaction

In some cases, the iminophosphorane is not isolated but generated in situ. In this manifestation, the phosphine, carbonyl, and organic azide are combined

== Scope and limitations ==
Besides preparing imines from aldehydes and ketones, the aza-Wittig-reaction can also convert carbon dioxide to isocyanates, carbon disulfide to organic thiocyanates, and isocyanates to carbodiimides.

There exists solid-supported modifications of the reaction.

Similar to the Wittig reaction, the reaction suffers from issues with triphenylphosphine oxide by-product removal. Such an issue is mitigated via catalytic aza-Wittig-reactions, some of which entail elements other than phosphorus, like arsenic and tellurium.

== History ==
The reagent for the aza-Wittig reaction, iminophosphorane, was discovered in 1919 by Hermann Staudinger. The reaction itself was discovered thirty years later.

== Examples ==
An example of the aza-Wittig-reaction being utilized in organic synthesis is the synthesis of (–)-benzomalvin A. Two intramolecular aza-Wittig-reactions were used to construct the seven-membered ring and the six-membered ring in the molecule's skeleton.

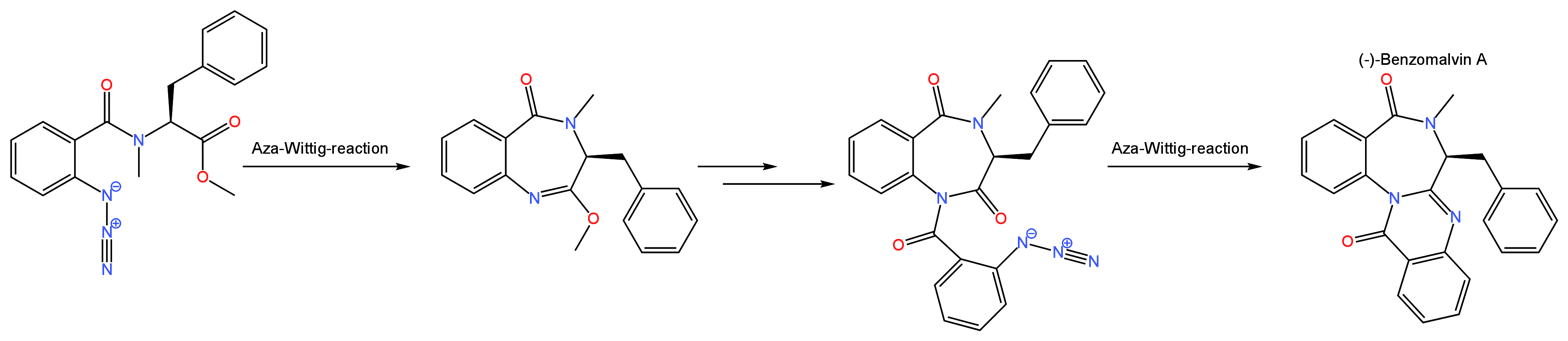
Synthesis of (−)-Benzomalvin A via multiple aza-Wittig-reactions

== See also ==
- Staudinger reaction
- Schiff base
- Wittig reaction
- Imine
