= C2H6N2O2 =

The molecular formula C_{2}H_{6}N_{2}O_{2} (molar mass: 90.08 g/mol) may refer to:

- Methylazoxymethanol
- Dimethylnitramine
- Methylolurea
- Methyl carbazate
- 2-Nitroethanamine
- N-Nitroethanamine
