= Triphenylphosphine phenylimide =

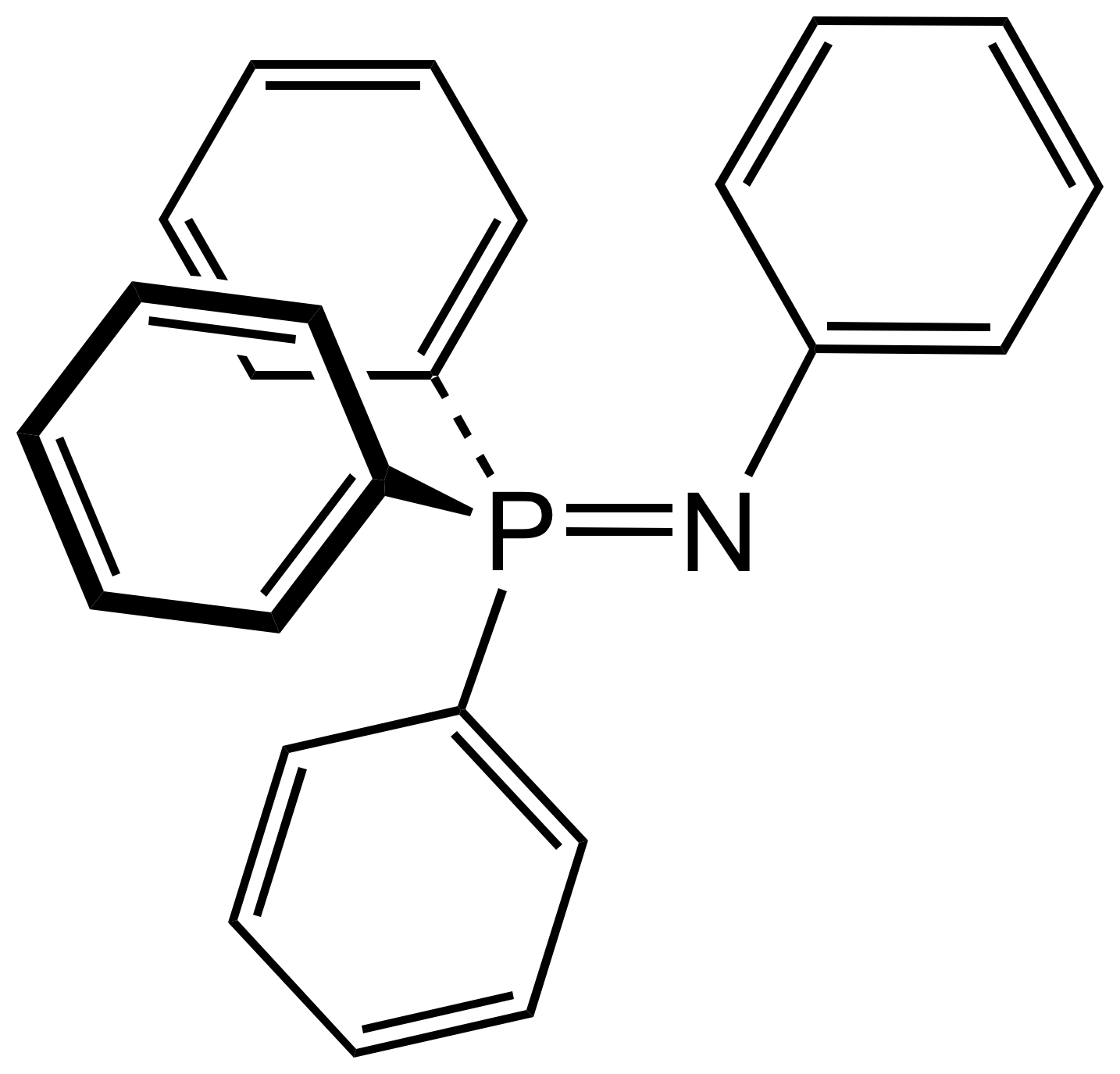

Names
- Preferred IUPAC name Tetraphenylphosphanimine
- Other names: Tetraphenylphosphine imide; N-(Triphenylphosphoranylidene)benzenamine; (Phenylimino)triphenylphosphorane; N-(Triphenylphosphoranylidene)aniline; N-Phenylimino(triphenyl)phosphorane

Identifiers
| CAS Number | 2325-27-1 |
| 3D model (JSmol) | Interactive image |
| ChemSpider | 67888 |
| ECHA InfoCard | 100.017.309 |
| EC Number | 219-039-1 |
| PubChem CID | 75352 |
| UNII | 6L9PT46NGV |
| CompTox Dashboard (EPA) | DTXSID80177820 |
- InChI: InChI=1S/C24H20NP/c1-5-13-21(14-6-1)25-26(22-15-7-2-8-16-22,23-17-9-3-10-18-23)24-19-11-4-12-20-24/h1-20H Key: PTLOPIHJOPWUNN-UHFFFAOYSA-N
- SMILES: c1ccc(cc1)N=P(c2ccccc2)(c3ccccc3)c4ccccc4

Properties
| Chemical formula | C_{24}H_{20}NP |
| Molar mass | 353.405 g·mol^{−1} |
| Appearance | White solid |
| Density | 1.239 g/cm^{3} |
| Melting point | 131–132 °C (268–270 °F; 404–405 K) |
- Except where otherwise noted, data are given for materials in their standard state (at 25 °C [77 °F], 100 kPa). Infobox references

Triphenylphosphine phenylimide is the organophosphorus compound with the formula Ph_{3}P=NPh (Ph = C_{6}H_{5}). The compound is classified as a phosphanimine. This white solid is soluble in organic solvents. The compound is a prototype of a large class of Staudinger reagents, resulting from the Staudinger reaction.

The phosphanimines were first prepared in the laboratory of Nobelist Hermann Staudinger. His synthesis involved the direct reaction of triphenylphosphine with phenylazide.

Ph_{3}P + N_{3}Ph → Ph_{3}P=NPh + N_{2}

X-ray crystallography establishes that the P–N–C angle is bent (130.4°) and the P–N distance is 160 pm.
