= CH3O =

The molecular formula CH_{3}O may refer to:

- Hydroxymethyl group (HOCH_{2}–)
- Methoxy group (H_{3}CO–)
