= Triphenylcarbethoxymethylenephosphorane =

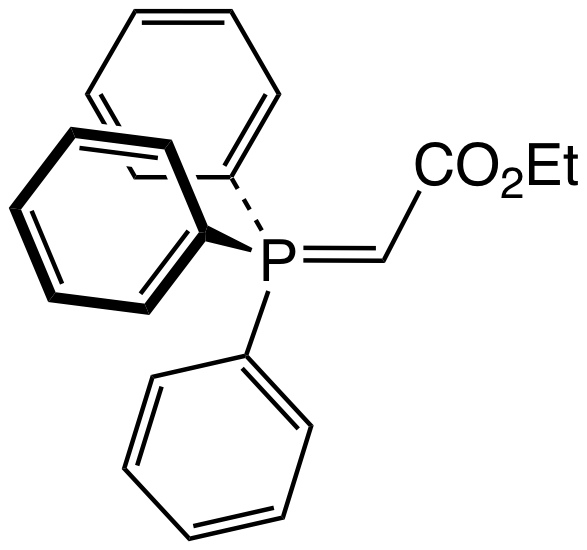

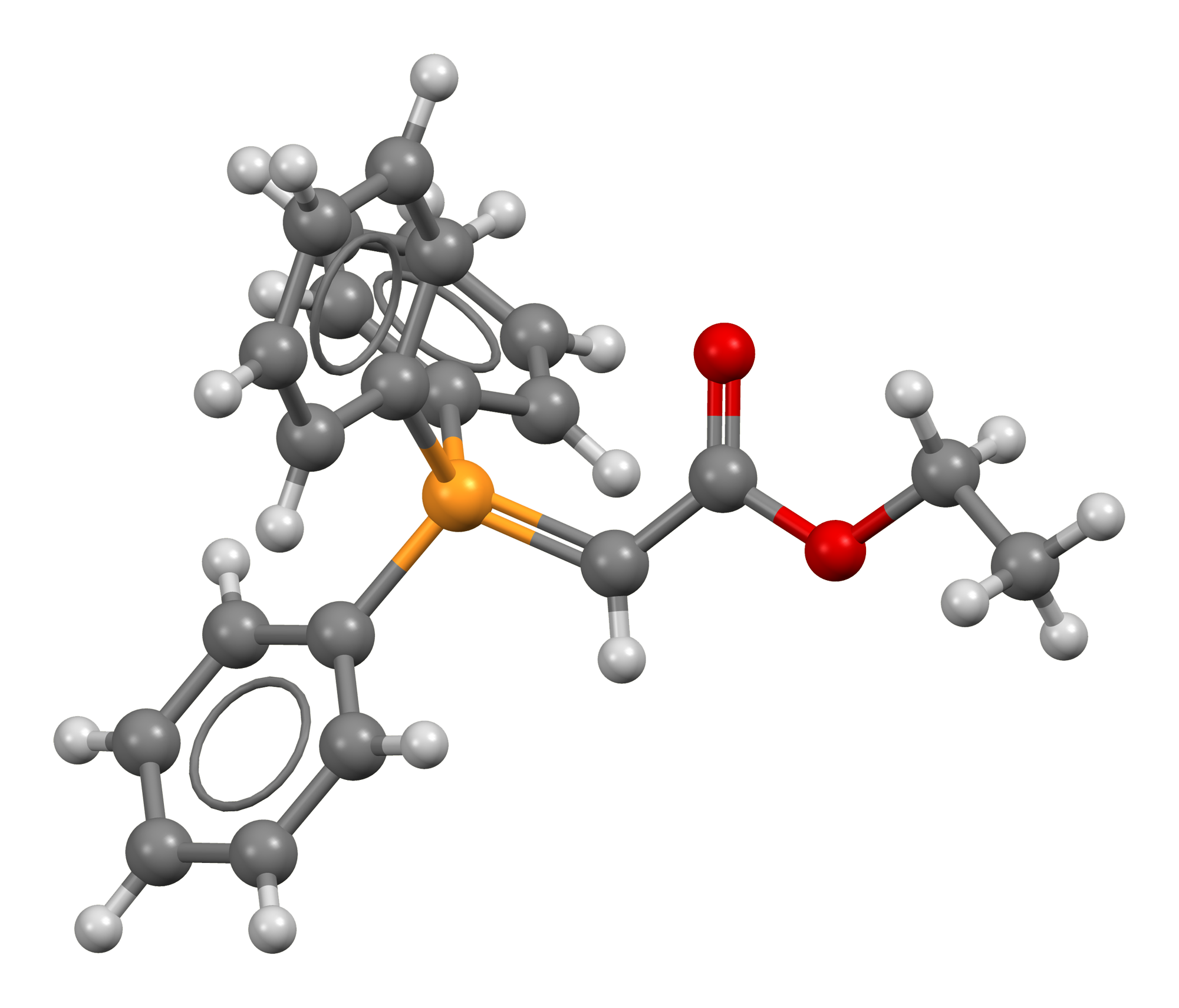

Names
- Preferred IUPAC name Ethyl (triphenyl-λ^{5}-phosphanylidene)acetate
- Other names (2-Ethoxy-2-oxoethylidene)triphenylphosphorane (Carbethoxymethylene)triphenylphosphorane (Carbethoxymethylidene)triphenylphosphorane (Ethoxycarbonylmethylidene)triphenylphosphorane Ethyl (triphenylphosphoranylidene)acetate

Identifiers
CAS Number	1099-45-2
3D model (JSmol)	Interactive image
ChemSpider	63836
ECHA InfoCard	100.012.865
PubChem CID	24892754
UNII	WX75SQL8ZF
CompTox Dashboard (EPA)	DTXSID7061485
- InChI: InChI=1/CH2N2O4/c4-2(5)1-3(6)7/h1H2
- SMILES: O=C(OCC)C=P(c1ccccc1)(c2ccccc2)c3ccccc3

Properties
Chemical formula	C_{22}H_{21}O_{2}P
Molar mass	348.382 g·mol^{−1}
Melting point	124 to 129 °C (255 to 264 °F; 397 to 402 K)
- Except where otherwise noted, data are given for materials in their standard state (at 25 °C [77 °F], 100 kPa). Infobox references

Triphenylcarbethoxymethylenephosphorane is an organophosphorus compound with the chemical formula Ph_{3}PCHCO_{2}Et (Ph = phenyl, Et = ethyl). It is a white solid that is soluble in organic solvents.

The compound is a Wittig reagent. It is used to replace oxygen centres in ketones and aldehydes with CHCO_{2}Et.
