= Kinnear–Perren reaction =

Chemical reaction

In organophosphorus chemistry, the Kinnear–Perren reaction (sometimes the Clay-Kinnear-Perren reaction) is used to prepare alkylphosphonyl dichlorides (RP(O)Cl_{2}) and alkylphosphonate esters (RP(O)(OR')_{2}). The reactants are alkyl chloride, phosphorus trichloride, and aluminium trichloride as catalyst. The reaction proceeds via the alkyltrichlorophosphonium salt:

RCl + PCl_{3} + AlCl_{3} → [RPCl_{3}]^{+}AlCl_{4}^{−}

Reduction of this trichlorophosphonium intermediate with aluminium powder gives alkyldichlorophosphines (RPCl_{2}).

Partial hydrolysis of the same intermediate gives the alkylphosphonyl dichloride:

[RPCl_{3}]^{+}AlCl_{4}^{−} + H_{2}O → RP(O)Cl_{2} + AlCl_{3} + 2 HCl

The reaction was first reported by Clay and expanded upon by Kinnear and Perren, who demonstrated that the four chlorinated methanes (CH_{4−x}Cl_{x}) give the corresponding CH_{3}-, CH_{2}Cl-, CHCl_{2}-, and CCl_{3}-substituted derivatives. They also demonstrated workup with hydrogen sulfide to give the alkylthiophosphoryl dichlorides.
