= Methyltriphenylphosphonium bromide =

Names
- Preferred IUPAC name Methyltri(phenyl)phosphanium bromide

Identifiers
CAS Number	1779-49-3
3D model (JSmol)	Interactive image
ChEMBL	ChEMBL54469
ChemSpider	67086
EC Number	217-218-9
PubChem CID	74505
UNII	LW2UZ3E9EG
CompTox Dashboard (EPA)	DTXSID30883580
- InChI: InChI=1S/C19H18P.BrH/c1-20(17-11-5-2-6-12-17,18-13-7-3-8-14-18)19-15-9-4-10-16-19;/h2-16H,1H3;1H/q+1;/p-1 Key: LSEFCHWGJNHZNT-UHFFFAOYSA-M
- SMILES: C[P+](C1=CC=CC=C1)(C2=CC=CC=C2)C3=CC=CC=C3.[Br-]

Properties
Chemical formula	C_{19}H_{18}BrP
Molar mass	357.231 g·mol^{−1}
Appearance	white solid

Hazards
- GHS labelling
Pictograms	(GHS06: Toxic) (GHS07: Exclamation mark) (GHS09: Environmental hazard)
Signal word	Danger
Hazard statements	H300, H301, H302, H312, H315, H319, H332, H411
Precautionary statements	P261, P264, P270, P271, P273, P280, P301+P310, P301+P312, P302+P352, P304+P312, P304+P340, P305+P351+P338, P312, P321, P322, P330, P332+P313, P337+P313, P362, P363, P391, P405, P501
- Except where otherwise noted, data are given for materials in their standard state (at 25 °C [77 °F], 100 kPa). Infobox references

Methyltriphenylphosphonium bromide is the organophosphorus compound with the formula [(C_{6}H_{5})_{3}PCH_{3}]Br. It is the bromide salt of a phosphonium cation. It is a white salt that is soluble in polar organic solvents.

== Synthesis and reactions ==
Methyltriphenylphosphonium bromide is produced by treating triphenylphosphine with methyl bromide:

Ph_{3}P + CH_{3}Br → Ph_{3}PCH_{3}Br

Methyltriphenylphosphonium bromide is the principal precursor to methylenetriphenylphosphorane, a useful methylenating reagent. This conversion is achieved by treating methyltriphenylphosphonium bromide with strong base.

Ph_{3}PCH_{3}Br + BuLi → Ph_{3}PCH_{2} + LiBr + BuH
