= Tetramethylphosphonium bromide =

White, water-soluble organophosphorus compound

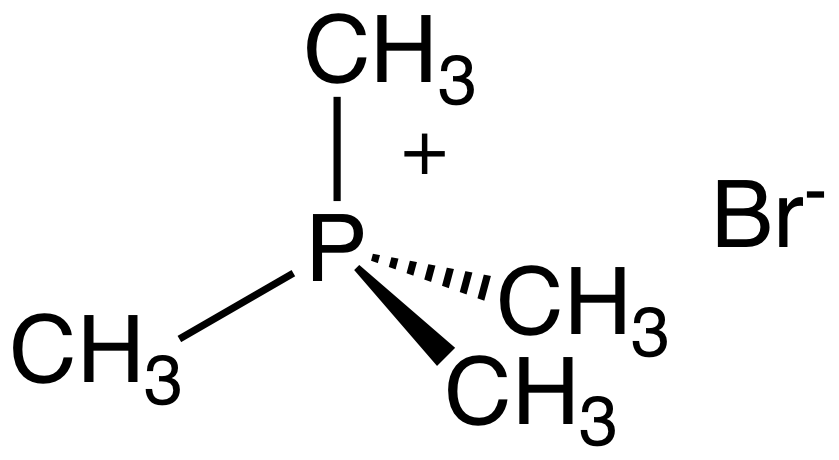

Identifiers
CAS Number	4519-28-2
3D model (JSmol)	Interactive image
ChemSpider	317445
ECHA InfoCard	100.152.249
PubChem CID	357594
UNII	UU5JF93X66
CompTox Dashboard (EPA)	DTXSID40326796
- InChI: InChI=1S/C4H12P.BrH/c1-5(2,3)4;/h1-4H3;1H/q+1;/p-1 Key: ZTXFOCMYRCGSMU-UHFFFAOYSA-M
- SMILES: C[P+](C)(C)C.[Br-]

Properties
Chemical formula	C_{4}H_{12}BrP
Molar mass	171.018 g·mol^{−1}
Appearance	white solid

Hazards
- GHS labelling
Pictograms	(GHS07: Exclamation mark)
Signal word	Warning
Hazard statements	H315, H319, H335
Precautionary statements	P261, P264, P271, P280, P302+P352, P304+P340, P305+P351+P338, P312, P321, P332+P313, P337+P313, P362, P403+P233, P405, P501
- Except where otherwise noted, data are given for materials in their standard state (at 25 °C [77 °F], 100 kPa). Infobox references

Tetramethylphosphonium bromide is an organophosphorus compound with the formula (CH_{3})_{4}PBr. It is a white, water-soluble solid, the salt of the cation tetramethylphosphonium and the bromide anion. It is prepared by treating trimethylphosphine with methyl bromide.

== Reactions ==
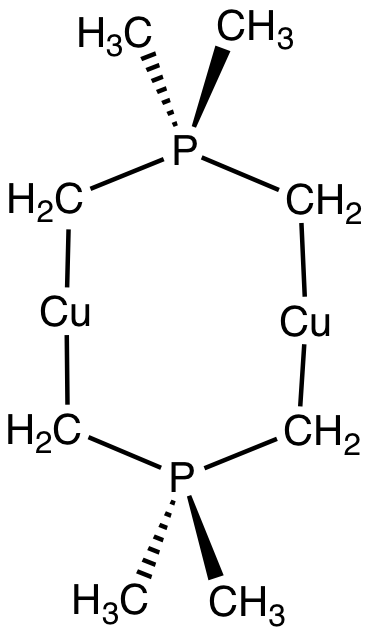
Structure of Cu_{2}[(Me_{2}P(CH_{2})_{2}]_{2}.

Deprotonation gives methylenetrimethylphosphine ylide, which can sustain a second deprotonation:

(CH_{3})_{4}PBr + BuLi → (CH_{3})_{3}P=CH_{2} + LiBr + BuH
(CH_{3})_{3}P=CH_{2} + BuLi → (CH_{3})_{2}P(CH_{2})_{2}Li + BuH

The latter is a precursor to many coordination complexes, e.g., the dicuprous complex Cu_{2}[(Me_{2}P(CH_{2})_{2}]_{2}.
