= Phosphonium =

Family of polyatomic cations containing phosphorus

Phosphonium ion

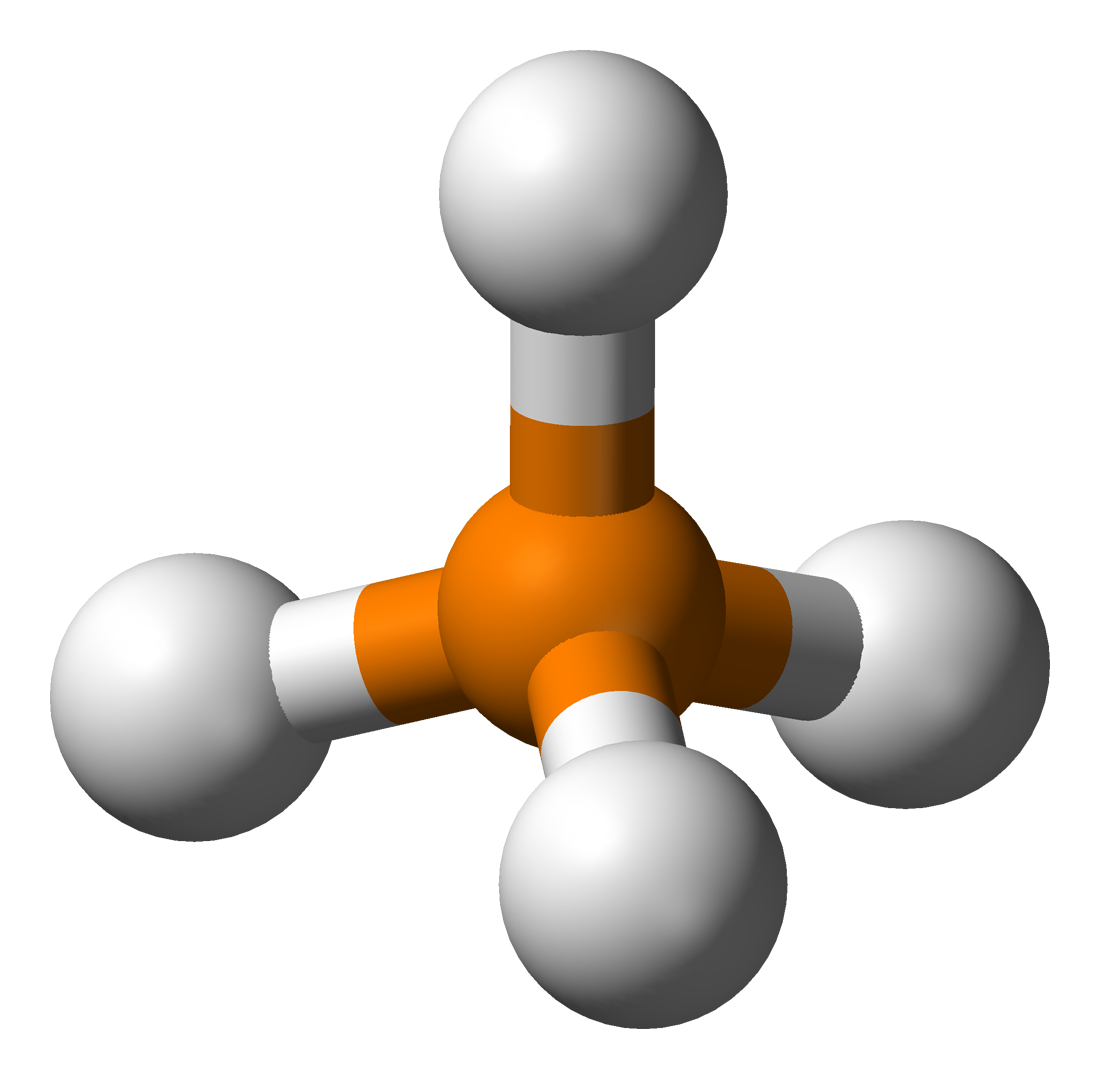
Structure of PH^{+}_{4}, the parent phosphonium cation.

In chemistry, the term phosphonium (more obscurely: phosphinium) describes polyatomic cations with the chemical formula PR^{+}_{4} (where R is a hydrogen or an alkyl, aryl, organyl or halogen group). These cations have tetrahedral structures. The salts are generally colorless or take the color of the anions.

== Types of phosphonium cations ==
=== Protonated phosphines ===
The parent phosphonium is PH^{+}_{4} as found in the iodide salt, phosphonium iodide. Salts of the parent PH^{+}_{4} are rarely encountered, but this ion is an intermediate in the preparation of the industrially useful tetrakis(hydroxymethyl)phosphonium chloride:

PH_{3} + HCl + 4 CH_{2}O → P(CH_{2}OH)^{+}_{4}Cl^{−}

Many organophosphonium salts are produced by protonation of primary, secondary, and tertiary phosphines:

PR_{3} + H^{+} → HPR^{+}_{3}

The basicity of phosphines follows the usual trends, with R = alkyl being more basic than R = aryl.

=== Tetraorganophosphonium cations ===
Common phosphonium compounds have four organic substituents attached to phosphorus. Some quaternary phosphonium cations include tetraphenylphosphonium, (C_{6}H_{5})_{4}P^{+} and tetramethylphosphonium P(CH_{3})^{+}_{4}.

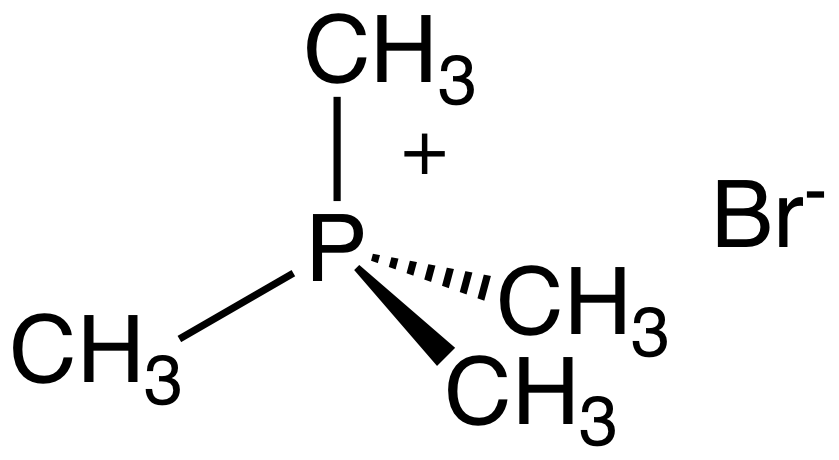
Tetramethylphosphonium bromide

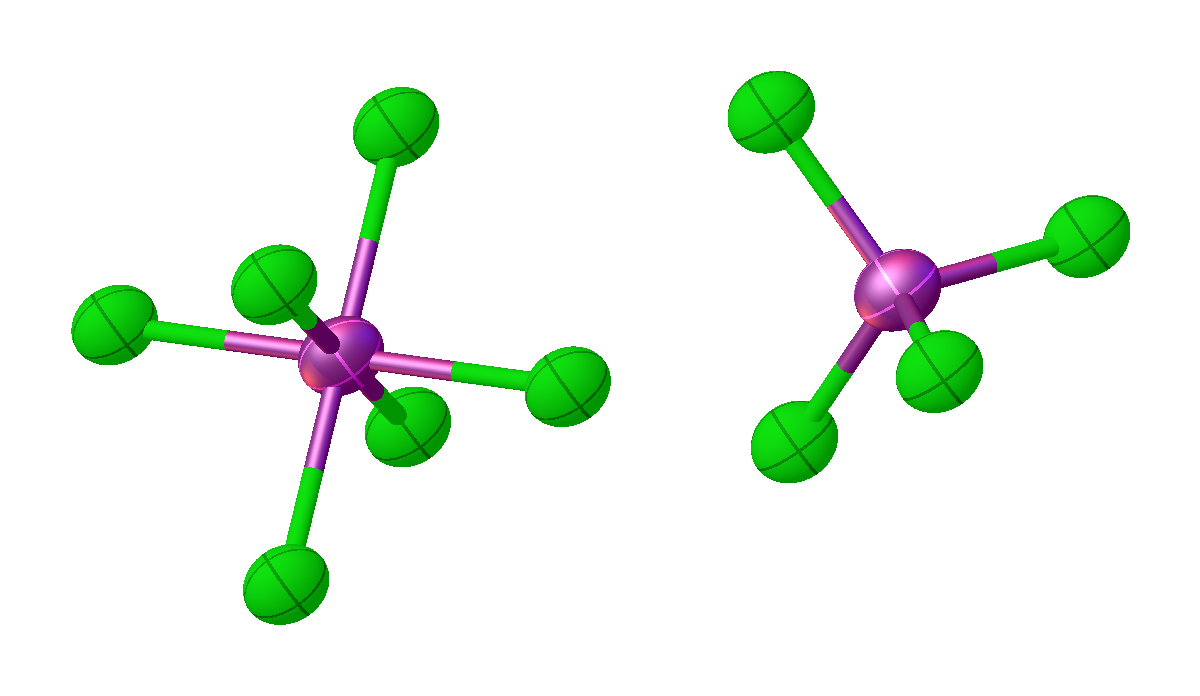
Structure of solid "phosphorus pentachloride", illustrating its autoionization to tetrachlorophosphonium.

Quaternary phosphonium cations (PR^{+}_{4}) are produced by alkylation of organophosphines. For example, the reaction of triphenylphosphine with methyl bromide gives methyltriphenylphosphonium bromide:

PPh_{3} + CH_{3}Br → [CH_{3}PPh_{3}]^{+}Br^{−}

The methyl group in such phosphonium salts is mildly acidic, with a pK_{a} estimated to be near 15:

[CH_{3}PPh_{3}]^{+} + base → CH_{2}=PPh_{3} + [Hbase]^{+}

This deprotonation reaction gives Wittig reagents.

These salts are used as supporting electrolytes for electrochemical reactions.

=== Phosphorus pentachloride and related compounds ===
Solid phosphorus pentachloride is an ionic compound, formulated [PCl_{4}]^{+}[PCl_{6}]^{−} (tetrachlorophosphonium hexachlorophosphate(V)), that is, a salt containing the tetrachlorophosphonium cation. Dilute solutions dissociate according to the following equilibrium:

PCl_{5} ⇌ PCl^{+}_{4} + Cl^{−}

Triphenylphosphine dichloride (Ph_{3}PCl_{2}) exists both as the pentacoordinate phosphorane and as the chlorotriphenylphosphonium chloride, depending on the medium. The situation is similar to that of PCl_{5}. It is an ionic compound (PPh_{3}Cl)^{+}Cl^{−} in polar solutions and a molecular species with trigonal bipyramidal molecular geometry in apolar solution.

=== Alkoxyphosphonium salts: Arbuzov reaction ===
The Michaelis–Arbuzov reaction is the chemical reaction of a trivalent phosphorus ester with an alkyl halide to form a pentavalent phosphorus species and another alkyl halide. Commonly, the phosphorus substrate is a phosphite ester (P(OR)_{3}) and the alkylating agent is an alkyl iodide.

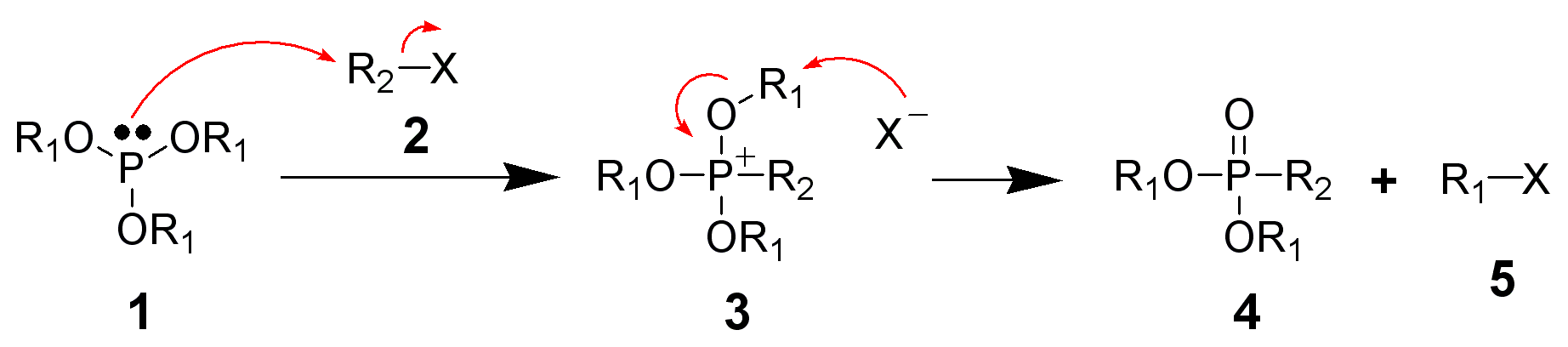
The mechanism of the Michaelis–Arbuzov reaction

== Uses ==
=== Textile finishes ===
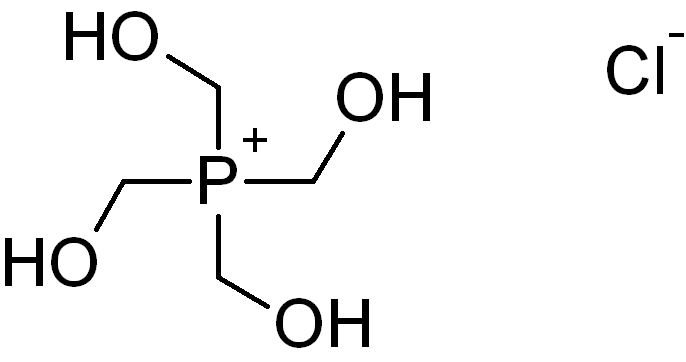
Tetrakis(hydroxymethyl)phosphonium chloride is used in production of textiles.

Tetrakis(hydroxymethyl)phosphonium chloride has industrial importance in the production of crease-resistant and flame-retardant finishes on cotton textiles and other cellulosic fabrics. A flame-retardant finish can be prepared from THPC by the Proban Process, in which THPC is treated with urea. The urea condenses with the hydroxymethyl groups on THPC. The phosphonium structure is converted to phosphine oxide as the result of this reaction.

=== Phase-transfer catalysts and precipitating agents ===
Organic phosphonium cations are lipophilic and can be useful in phase transfer catalysis, much like quaternary ammonium salts. Salts or inorganic anions and tetraphenylphosphonium (PPh^{+}_{4}) are soluble in polar organic solvents. One example is the perrhenate (PPh_{4}[ReO_{4}]).

=== Reagents for organic synthesis ===
Wittig reagents are used in organic synthesis. They are derived from phosphonium salts. A strong base such as butyllithium or sodium amide is required for the deprotonation:

[Ph_{3}P^{+}CH_{2}R]X^{−} + C_{4}H_{9}Li → Ph_{3}P=CHR + LiX + C_{4}H_{10}

One of the simplest ylides is methylenetriphenylphosphorane (Ph_{3}P=CH_{2}).

The compounds Ph_{3}PX_{2} (X = Cl, Br) are used in the Kirsanov reaction. The Kinnear–Perren reaction is used to prepare alkylphosphonyl dichlorides (RP(O)Cl_{2}) and esters (RP(O)(OR′)_{2}). A key intermediate are alkyltrichlorophosphonium salts, obtained by the alkylation of phosphorus trichloride:

RCl + PCl_{3} + AlCl_{3} → [RPCl_{3}]^{+}AlCl^{−}_{4}

== See also ==
- Ammonium (NH^{+}_{4})
- Arsonium (AsH^{+}_{4})
- Hydronium (H_{3}O^{+})
- Onium compounds
- Organophosphorus chemistry
