= Tributylphosphine =

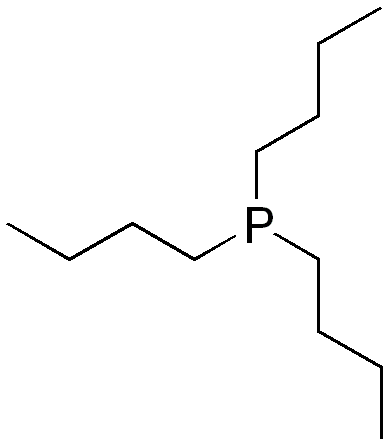

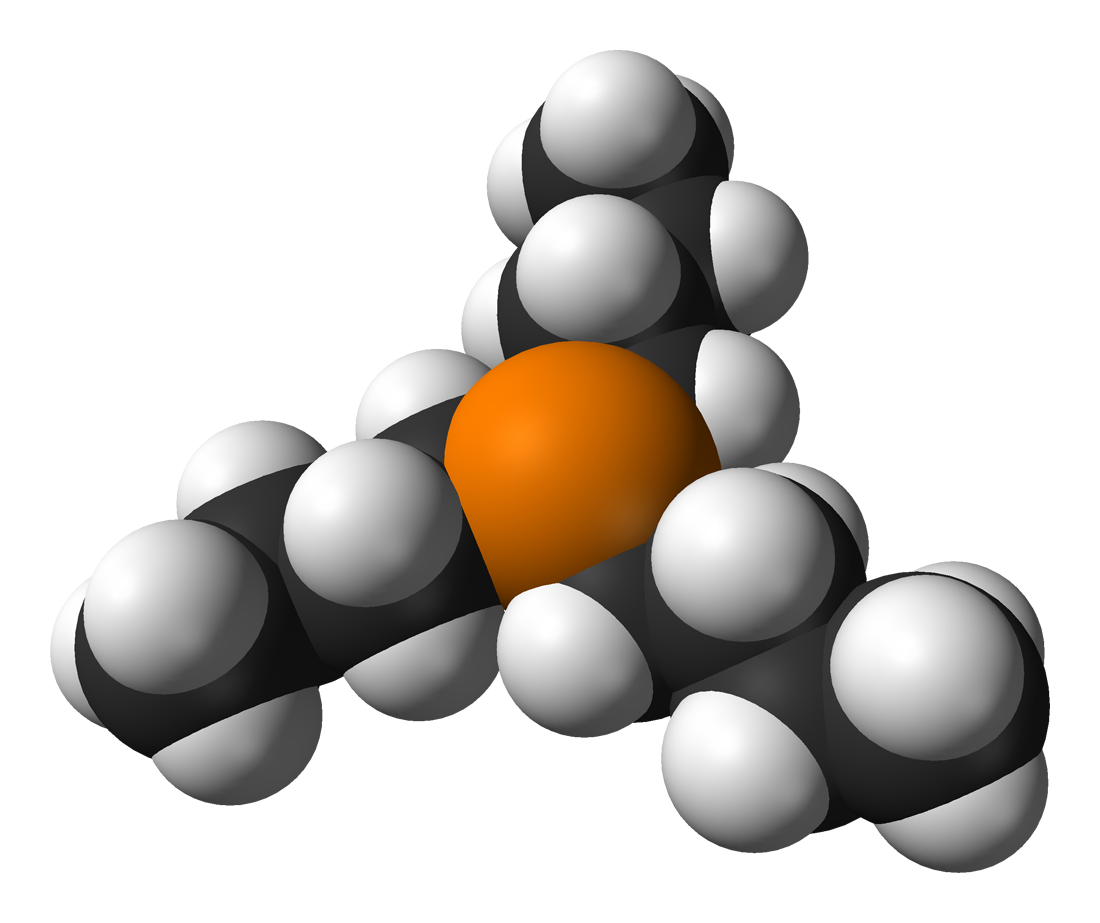
- Phosphorus, P Carbon, C Hydrogen, H

Names
- Preferred IUPAC name Tributylphosphane
- Other names Tributylphosphine

Identifiers
CAS Number	998-40-3
3D model (JSmol)	Interactive image
ChEMBL	ChEMBL3185473
ChemSpider	13231
ECHA InfoCard	100.012.410
EC Number	213-651-2
PubChem CID	13831
UNII	0O52FJR7WN
UN number	3254
CompTox Dashboard (EPA)	DTXSID9046998
- InChI: InChI=1/C12H27P/c1-4-7-10-13(11-8-5-2)12-9-6-3/h4-12H2,1-3H3 Key: TUQOTMZNTHZOKS-UHFFFAOYAQ
- SMILES: CCCCP(CCCC)CCCC

Properties
Chemical formula	P(CH_{2}CH_{2}CH_{2}CH_{3})_{3}
Molar mass	202.322 g·mol^{−1}
Appearance	Colorless oily liquid
Odor	Stench, nauseating
Density	0.82 g/ml
Melting point	−60 °C; −76 °F; 213 K
Boiling point	240 °C; 464 °F; 513 K (150 °C (302 °F; 423 K) at 50 mmHg)
Solubility in water	negligible
Solubility	organic solvents such as heptane

Related compounds
Related	Trimethylphosphine; Triphenylphosphine; Tributylamine

Hazards
- Occupational safety and health (OHS/OSH)
Main hazards	Stench, Flammable, Corrosive
- GHS labelling
Pictograms	(GHS02: Flammable) (GHS05: Corrosive) (GHS07: Exclamation mark) (GHS09: Environmental hazard)
Signal word	Danger
Hazard statements	H226, H250, H251, H302, H312, H314, H411
Precautionary statements	P210, P222, P233, P235+P410, P240, P241, P242, P243, P260, P264, P270, P273, P280, P301+P312, P301+P330+P331, P302+P334, P302+P352, P303+P361+P353, P304+P340, P305+P351+P338, P310, P312, P321, P322, P330, P363, P370+P378, P391, P403+P235, P405, P407, P413, P420, P422, P501
NFPA 704 (fire diamond)	1 3 2
Flash point	117 °C (243 °F; 390 K)
Autoignition temperature	168 °C (334 °F; 441 K)
- Lethal dose or concentration (LD, LC)
LD_{50} (median dose)	750 mg/kg (oral, rats)
- Except where otherwise noted, data are given for materials in their standard state (at 25 °C [77 °F], 100 kPa). verify (what is ?) Infobox references

Tributylphosphine is the organophosphorus compound with the chemical formula P(CH_{2}CH_{2}CH_{2}CH_{3})_{3}, often abbreviated as PBu_{3}. It is a tertiary phosphine. It is an oily liquid at room temperature, with a nauseating odor. It reacts slowly with atmospheric oxygen, and rapidly with other oxidizing agents, to give tributylphosphine oxide. It is usually handled using air-free techniques.

== Preparation ==
Tributylphosphine is prepared industrially by the hydrophosphination of phosphine with 1-butene: the addition proceeds by a free radical mechanism, and so the Markovnikov rule is not followed.

PH_{3} + 3 CH_{2}=CHCH_{2}CH_{3} → P(CH_{2}CH_{2}CH_{2}CH_{3})_{3}

Tributylphosphine can be prepared in the laboratory by reaction of the appropriate Grignard reagent with phosphorus trichloride although, as it is commercially available at reasonable prices, it is rare to have to perform the small-scale preparation.

3 CH_{3}CH_{2}CH_{2}CH_{2}MgCl + PCl_{3} → P(CH_{2}CH_{2}CH_{2}CH_{3})_{3} + 3 MgCl_{2}

== Reactions ==
Tributylphosphine reacts with oxygen to give the corresponding phosphine oxide (here tributylphosphine oxide):

2 P(CH_{2}CH_{2}CH_{2}CH_{3})_{3} + O_{2} → 2 O=P(CH_{2}CH_{2}CH_{2}CH_{3})_{3}

Because this reaction is so fast, the compound is usually handled under an inert atmosphere.

The phosphine is also easily alkylated. For example, benzyl chloride gives a phosphonium salt (here tributyl(phenylmethyl)phosphonium chloride):

P(CH_{2}CH_{2}CH_{2}CH_{3})_{3} + PhCH_{2}Cl → [PhCH_{2}P(CH_{2}CH_{2}CH_{2}CH_{3})_{3}]^{+}Cl^{−}

Tributylphosphine is a common ligand for the preparation of complexes of transition metals in low oxidation states. It is cheaper and less air-sensitive than trimethylphosphine and other trialkylphosphines. Although its complexes are generally highly soluble, they are often more difficult to crystallize compared to complexes of more rigid phosphines. Furthermore, the 1H NMR properties are less easily interpreted and can mask signals for other ligands. Compared to other tertiary phosphines, it is compact (cone angle: 136°) and basic (χ-parameter: 5.25 cm^{−1})

== Use ==
Tributylphosphine finds some industrial use as a catalyst modifier in the cobalt-catalyzed hydroformylation of alkenes, where it greatly increases the ratio of straight-chain aldehydes to branched-chain aldehydes in the product mixture. However, tricyclohexylphosphine is even more effective for this purpose (although more expensive) and, in any case, rhodium catalysts are usually preferred to cobalt catalysts for the hydroformylation of alkenes.

It is the precursor to the pesticide (2,4-dichlorobenzyl)tributylphosphonium chloride ("Phosfleur").

Although tributylphosphine is generally regarded as toxic, its biological effects can be manipulated by drug delivery strategies. For example, a photoactivatable version of tributylphosphine has been used to induce disulfide bond cleavage and reductive stress in living cells.

== Odor ==
The main laboratory inconvenience of tributylphosphine is its unpleasant smell.

== Hazards ==
Tributylphosphine is moderately toxic, with an LD50 of 750 mg/kg (oral, rats).
