= Hydroxymethyl group =

Functional group

Pentaerythritol features four hydroxymethyl groups

The hydroxymethyl group is a substituent with the structural formula −CH_{2}−OH. It consists of a methylene bridge (−CH_{2}− unit) bonded to a hydroxyl group (−OH). This makes the hydroxymethyl group a primary alcohol. It is a constitutional isomer of the methoxy group (−O−CH_{3}), differing only in the attachment site and orientation to the rest of the molecule. However, their chemical properties are different for an alcohol as opposed to an ether.

All primary alcohols feature a hydroxymethyl group, but often the term is reserved for compounds where the point of attachment is not CH_{2} nor even CH. A major exception to this pattern is the description of several sugars as containing hydroxymethyl groups.

== Occurrence ==
=== Organic chemistry ===
==== Nature ====
C6 of glucose is a hydroxymethyl group

Hydroxymethyl is the side chain of encoded amino acid serine. This hydroxymethyl group is the site of many post-translational modifications.

Many sugars and carbohydrates feature hydroxymethyl groups, prominently C6 of glucose and mannose, as well as both C1 and C6 of fructose. The partially dehydrated derivative of fructose, hydroxymethylfurfural retains the hydroxymethyl group affixed to a furan ring.

Pyridoxine, the precusor to vitamin B6, features two hydroxymethyl groups on a pyridine ring.

==== Industrial and laboratory chemicals ====
Many commercial polyols are hydroxymethyl compounds: pentaerythritol, trimethylolpropane, and methylolurea. Taking advantage of their multifunctionality, polymer cross-linking is their typical application.

Tris(hydroxymethyl)aminomethane, also known as "tris", is a common buffering agent.

=== Main group chemistry ===
Hydroxymethyl groups are pervasive in heteroatom and main group chemistry. Tris(hydroxymethyl)phosphine is one such example.

== Preparation ==
Typically, hydroxymethylation is achieved by the addition of formaldehyde to substrates bearing an "active" proton. For example, terminal alkynes add formaldehyde:

RC≡CH + CH_{2}O → RC≡CCH_{2}OH

Hydroxymethyl groups arise by hydroxylation of methoxy groups. This conversion enables demethylation of the herbicide dicamba.

Biodegradation of dicamba proceeds via a hydroxymethyl intermediate
