= Phosphinimide ligands =

Class of organic compounds

Phosphinimide ligands, also known as phosphorane iminato ligands, are any of a class of organic compounds of the general formula NPR_{3}^{−}. The R groups represent organic substituents or, in rare cases, halides or NR_{2} groups. NPR_{3}^{−} is isoelectronic with phosphine oxides (OPR_{3}) and siloxides ([OSiR_{3}]^{−}), but far more basic. By varying the R groups on P, a variety of ligands with different electronic and steric properties can be produced, and due to the high oxidation state of phosphorus, these ligands have good thermal stability. Many transition metal phosphinimide complexes have been well-developed as have main group phosphinimide complexes.

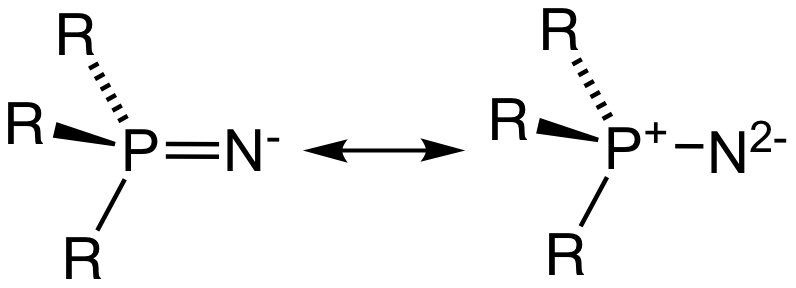

In main group phosphinimide complexes, only terminal and μ^{2}-N-bridging bonding modes are observed. The terminally bound bent ligands are primarily commonly have M-N-P bond angles ranging from 120 to 150°. Both the M-N and N-P bond lengths are appropriate for double bonds. This bonding can best be described by a covalent single bond with an overlaying share of polar bonding. The μ^{2}-N-bridging mode arises when the free electron pair at nitrogen gives rise to dimerization. These dimeric complexes yield different M-N bond lengths depending on the ligands present in the rest of the ligand sphere of M. When the complex contains two or four identical ligands, nearly equal M-N distances are observed, whereas, when different or odd-numbered identical ligands are in the complex, the M-N distances are all of significantly different length.

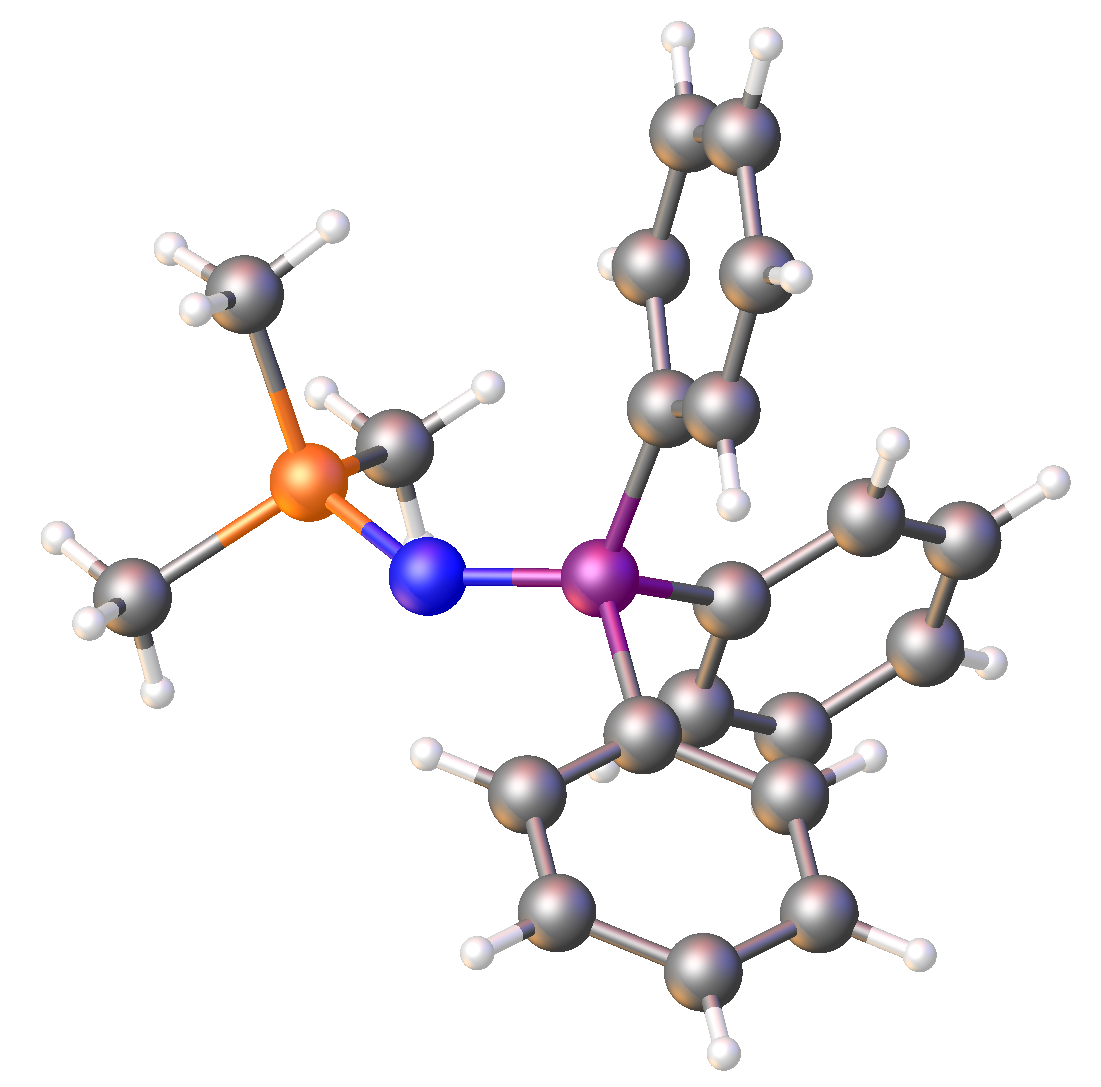
Structure of Ph_{3}PNSi(CH_{3})_{3}, a precursorr to complexes of "Ph_{3}PN^{−}".

== Synthesis ==
Phosphonimines with the formula R_{3}P=NSiMe_{3} are particularly useful. They are prepared by the Staudinger reaction of tertiary phosphines with trimethylsilyl azide:

R_{3}P + N_{3}SiMe_{3} → R_{3}P=NSiMe_{3} + N_{2}

R_{3}P=NSiMe_{3} undergoes alcoholysis to give the parent imine:

R_{3}P=NSiMe_{3} + MeOH → R_{3}P=NH + MeOSiMe_{3}

Ammonia can be used in place of alcohol.

Lithium phosphinimides are produced by deprotonation of the parent imine:

R_{3}P=NH + RLi → R_{3}P=NLi + RH

The lithio derivatives, which exist as tetrameric clusters in the solid state, are useful reagents.
