= Iminophosphorane =

Iminophosphoranes (also known as phosphine imides, phosphinimide, phosphinimines, λ_{5}-phosphazenes, acyclic phosphazenes) are a class of organophosphorus compounds and an acyclic subclass of phosphazenes with the general formula R_{3}P=NR′. First reported by Staudinger and Meyer in 1919, these isoelectronic analogues of phosphine oxides and phosphonium ylides (also known as Wittig reagents) are most commonly synthesized via the Staudinger reaction or Kirsanov reaction, though alternative synthetic routes have also been developed.

The P=N bond is best described as a highly polarized single bond consistent with ylidic resonance structure R_{3}P^{+}=N^{−}R′, and the steric and electronic character may be tuned by varying the substituents on either the phosphorus or nitrogen. These properties allowing for interesting reactivity of iminophosphoranes as a Brønsted superbase or coordinating ligand at the nitrogen, or for [2+2] cycloadditions with the P=N bond. Iminophosphoranes have found diverse applications as ligands for homogeneous catalysis (i.e. cross coupling, polymerization, etc.), superbasic or bifunctional organocatalysts, and probes for chemical biology.

== Synthesis ==
=== Staudinger Reaction ===
The earliest synthesis of an iminophosphorane was reported by Staudinger and Meyer in 1919 from the reaction of an azide and a phosphine with nitrogen extrusion. This reaction proceeds via nucleophilic attack of the phosphine on the azide through a cis-transition state to form a phosphazide intermediate which undergoes a four-membered ring closure to expel N_{2} (Figure 1). Over 100 years later, the Staudinger reaction remains one of the most general and widely used methods. A variation of the Staudinger reaction, Staudinger ligation, is a highly selective bioorthogonal reaction that is prominent in chemical biology in labeling or modifying cellular environments, proteins, DNA, etc.

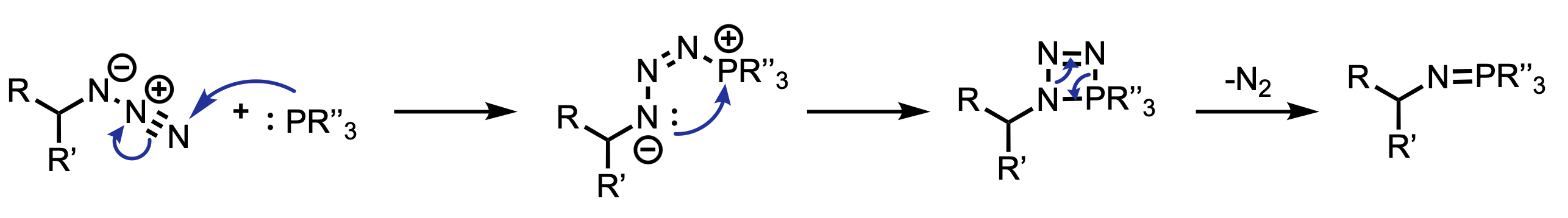
Figure 1. Staudinger reaction and mechanism between a phosphine and an azide to yield iminophosphorane product.

=== Kirsanov Reaction ===
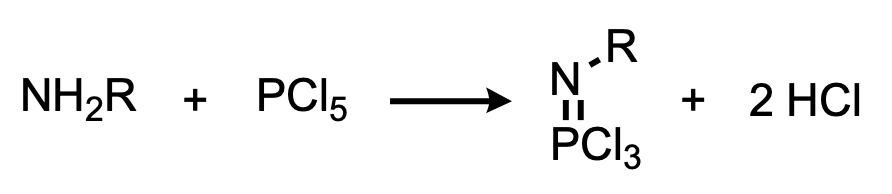
Figure 2. Kirsanov Reaction of phosphorus pentachloride and amines to yield P-halogenated iminophosphoranes.

A second notable method to synthesize iminophosphoranes is the Kirsanov reaction first reported in 1950 in which P-halogenated iminophosphoranes are accessed from phosphorus pentachloride and amine starting materials (Figure 2). In 1959 a modified Kirsanov reaction in which halogenation of a tertiary phosphine produces a phosphonium salt, which is treated in situ with a primary amine to yield the iminophosphorane (Figure 3) was published.

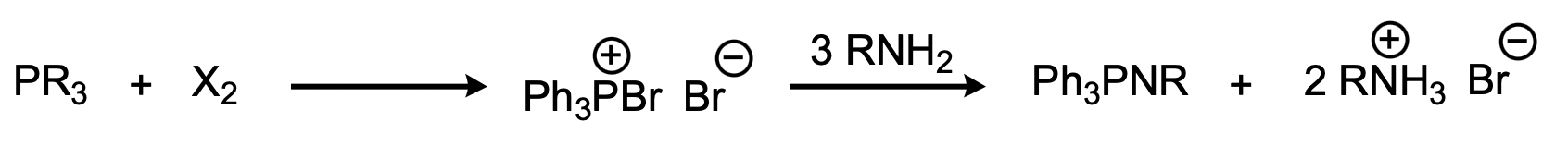
Figure 3. Modified Kirsanov reaction to access iminophosphoranes from tertiary phosphine, halogen, and primary amine starting materials.

=== Other Synthetic Routes ===
Staudinger and Kirsanov reactions are considered the two most common synthetic routes, but many other potential synthetic strategies to access iminophosphoranes have also been developed to address potential limitations. For instance, the Staudinger reaction involves high energy and potentially explosive azides, and there are some instances when azide may not be readily available. The phosphorus pentachloride and bromine reagents involved in the Kirsanov and modified Kirsanov reaction are also toxic. Examples of alternative routes include the synthesis of N-acyliminophosphoranes via iron-catalyzed imidization of phosphines with N-acyloxyamides (Figure 4, bottom) or by an iron-photocatalyzed nitrene transfer reaction with dioxazolones (Figure 4, top). Another example is the electrochemical nickel-catalyzed synthesis of N-cyanoiminophosphoranes from treating phosphines with bis(trimethylsilyl)carbodiimide (Figure 5).

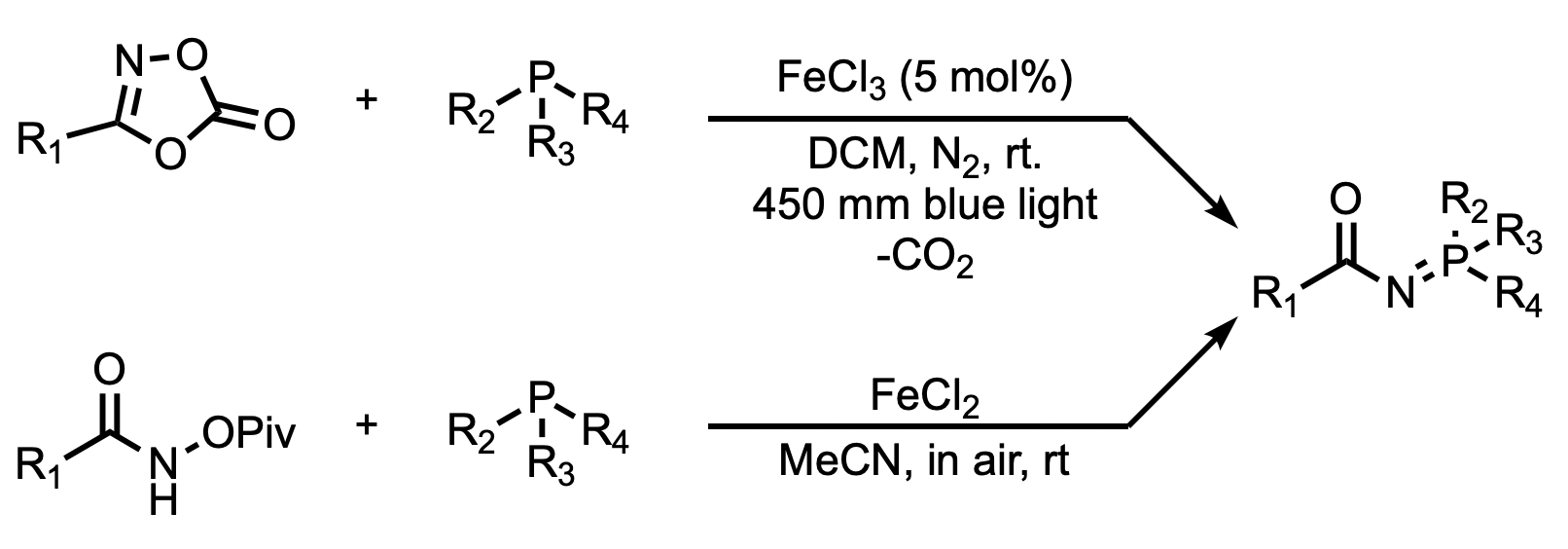
Figure 4. Synthesis of N-acyliminophosphoranes from iron-catalyzed imidization of phosphines with N-acyloxyamides (top) and iron-photocatalyzed reaction of dioxazolones and phosphines (bottom).

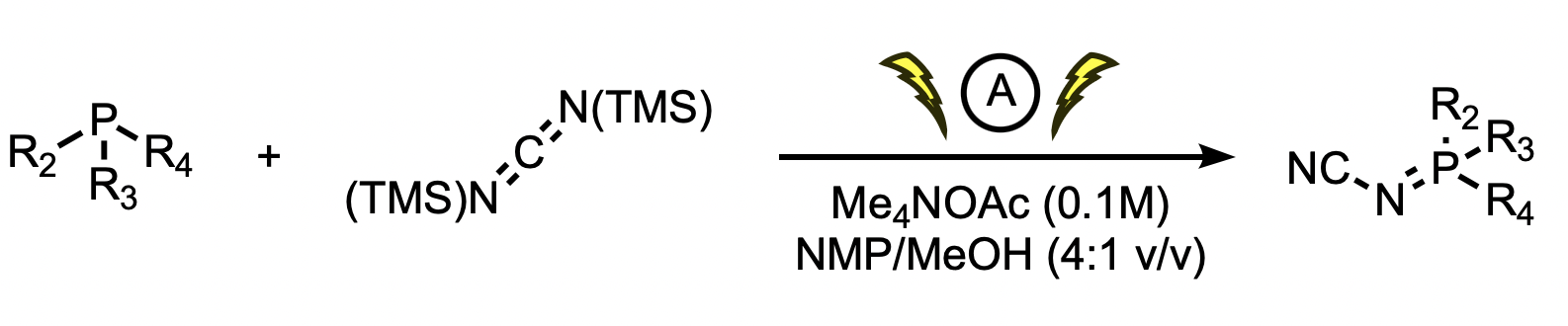
Figure 5. Nickel-catalyzed electrochemical synthesis of N-cyanoiminophosphoranes from bis(trimethylsilyl)carbodiimide and phosphine starting materials.

== Structure ==
The precise nature of the iminophosphorane P=N bond (and more generally, P=E bonds, where E = C, N, O) has historically been the subject of much discussion. Initially, from around 1950 to 1970, the P=N bond was thought to have significant contribution from a π-type interaction between low lying d orbitals on phosphorus and the p orbitals on nitrogen due to a shortened P=N bond length relative to a single P−N bond indicated by spectroscopic studies, dipole measurements, and X-ray analyses. However, further computations in the 1980s would clearly demonstrate that d-orbitals are not significantly involved in such bonds. This model was also inconsistent with observed reactivity (i.e. cleavage of the P−N bond by metal organyls in polar solvents or susceptibility to hydrolysis, which would be difficult with a true P=N double bond).

Figure 6. Resonance structures for iminophosphoranes with the ylene (left) and ylidic (right) forms

Over time, the accepted bond model was revised to be that there is no true P−C π bond and the interaction is instead best described as a strongly polarized P^{+}−N^{−} bond. The shortened strengthened bond and stabilization of the phosphorus can be justified by negative hyperconjugation, in which electron density on the nitrogen p-orbital delocalizes into the 𝜎* (P−C) orbital. This was supported by theoretical studies.

In 2004 experimental evidence of this model with charge-density studies and topological analysis of alkali-metal coordinated iminophosphoranes showed a polar P^{+}−N^{−} "augmented by electrostatic contributions." Therefore, although the iminophosphorane P=N bond is typically drawn as a double bond, it is highly polarized and is most accurately described as a hybrid of resonance contributors between the ylene and ylidic forms (Figure 6).

The P=N bond of iminophosphoranes is isoelectronic with the P=C bond of phosphonium ylides, also known as Wittig reagents, and comparisons between their structure and reactivity can be made. For instance, the P=C bond of the phosphonium ylide is similar to the P=N bond of iminophosphoranes in that both are best described with the ylidic resonance form with no true π bond and a short P=C bond due to negative hyperconjugation. Because of these structural similarities, both the iminophosphoranes and phosphinium ylides show strong 𝜎- donor and little to no π-acceptor capabilities. There are some structural differences, with computational studies demonstrating a slightly higher P=N bond order in the iminophosphorane compared to the P=C bond of the phosphonium ylide. A 2023 study comparing the two ylidic species demonstrated that electronic properties of both ylidic species are strongly influenced by the substituent, but between the unsubstituted ylides (P=CH_{2} vs. P=NH), the phosphonium ylide donates more electron density to a metal center. Furthermore, the Wittig reaction with the phosphonium ylide for the formation of C=C bonds is comparable to the aza-Wittig reaction see below with iminophosphoranes for the formation of C=N bonds, with both mechanisms proceeding through similar four-membered intermediates and generating phosphine oxide byproduct.

== Reactivity ==
=== Brønsted Basicity ===
Iminophosphoranes are strong Brønsted bases with high affinity for protons. In the proton adduct (R_{3}P=NR′H^{+}), the nitrogen favors a pyramidal sp^{3} hybridization and electron density still resides primarily on the nitrogen with partial positive charge on the phosphorus. Therefore, this adduct is best described as an aminophosphonium ion instead of an iminium ion.

Certain iminophosphorane derivatives are also known to behave as nonionic superbases. Generally, the study and design of strong neutral superbases is of great interest in organic synthesis applications due to their increased solubility in common solvents, allowance for milder conditions, and greater stability relative to inorganic ionic bases. The outstanding Brønsted basicity of amino-substituted iminophosphorane derivatives with high stability and kinetic activity was first reported in 1985, which would lay the foundation for future advances in the realm of iminophosphorane superbases. Computational studies in 2004 would later develop a theoretical framework for estimating pK_{BH+} values of iminophosphoranes and rationalize their basicity from effective resonance stabilization of the conjugate acid. This family of iminophosphorane superbases can be classified by Schwesinger's nomenclature (i.e. Pn, where n denotes the number of P=N units). The basicity can be increased by a number of factors including higher n, electron donating substituents, and branching.

The pK_{BH+} values in MeCN for select iminophosphoranes known in literature are shown in Figure 7.

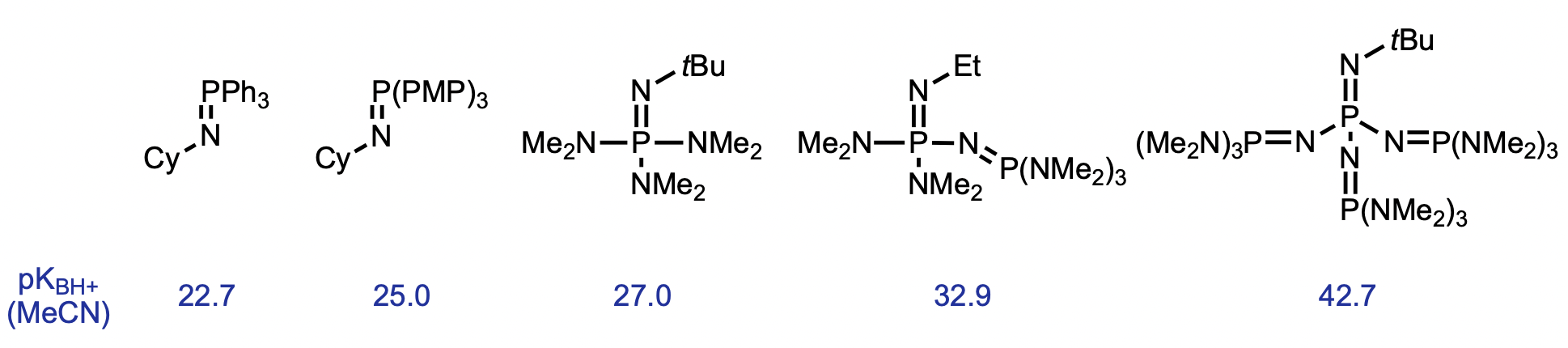
Figure 7. pK_{BH+} in MeCN of select iminophosphoranes from literature

=== Coordination to Metal Centers ===
As ligands, iminophosphoranes can coordinate to other centers (i.e. transition metals, main group elements) via lone pairs on the nitrogen. Iminophosphorane are predominantly hard 𝜎- donors, with possible π-donor capabilities due to the two lone pairs on nitrogen. Simple iminophosphoranes are monodentate neutral L-type donors, but additional donor sites can be incorporated in the iminophosphorane substituents to create polydentate ligands which allow for increased stability by the chelating effect. These polydentate mixed ligands are also highly useful for enabling selective catalysis, as the donor sites and linkers in these polydentate mixed ligands can be precisely tuned to vary reactivity.

In electron rich centers (i.e. late transition metals), iminophosphoranes tend to coordinate relatively weakly and are easily displaced by other ligands, which was first demonstrated in 1975 by the rapid displacement of iminophosphorane ligands by triphenylphosphine, triphenylphosphite, and 2,2'-bipyridine under mild conditions at Palladium(II) complex centers. However, iminophosphoranes, particularly polydentate mixed ligands, can bind most strongly to electron deficient centers (i.e. rare earth elements, early transition metals, and highly oxidized centers).

=== 2+2 Addition to P=N Bond ===
In addition to the nitrogen-centered reactivity, the phosphorus has also been shown to play a role in some reactions enabled by the vicinal ambiphilic character of the P=N bond. Despite the absence of the d-orbitals in the P=N bonds (compared to an analogous M=N transition metal imide), iminophosphoranes of the class X_{3}P=NR (X = Cl, pyrrolyl; R = alkyl, aryl) were shown to engage in catalytic double-bond metathesis in a Chauvin-type pathway, proceeding through a phosphetidine intermediate formed from [2+2] addition of carbodiimides to the iminophosphorane.

Another representative example is the aza-Wittig reaction, a widely used method of forming C=N double bonds in which an aldehyde or ketone reacts with a stoichiometric amount of iminophosphorane to yield an imine. The exact mechanism has historically been difficult to determine owing to the instability of the intermediates, but many theoretical studies support a two-step mechanism proceeding via a four-membered ring intermediate from the first tandem [2+2] cycloaddition-cycloreversion step in a thermally allowed mechanism, followed by the second [2+2] cycloreversion step (Figure 8).

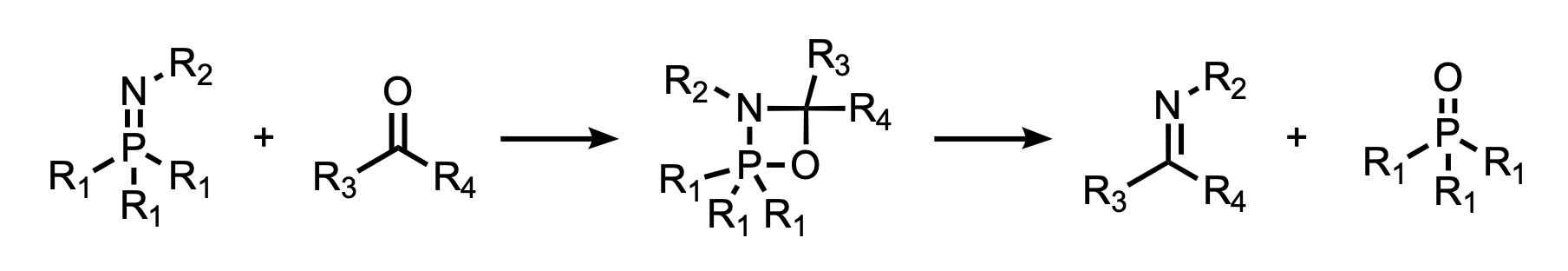
Figure 8. Aza-Wittig reaction and mechanism between stoichiometric amounts of a carbonyl compound and an iminophosphorane to yield an imine after proceeding through a four-membered ring intermediate

== Selected applications ==
=== Ligands for Homogeneous Catalysis ===
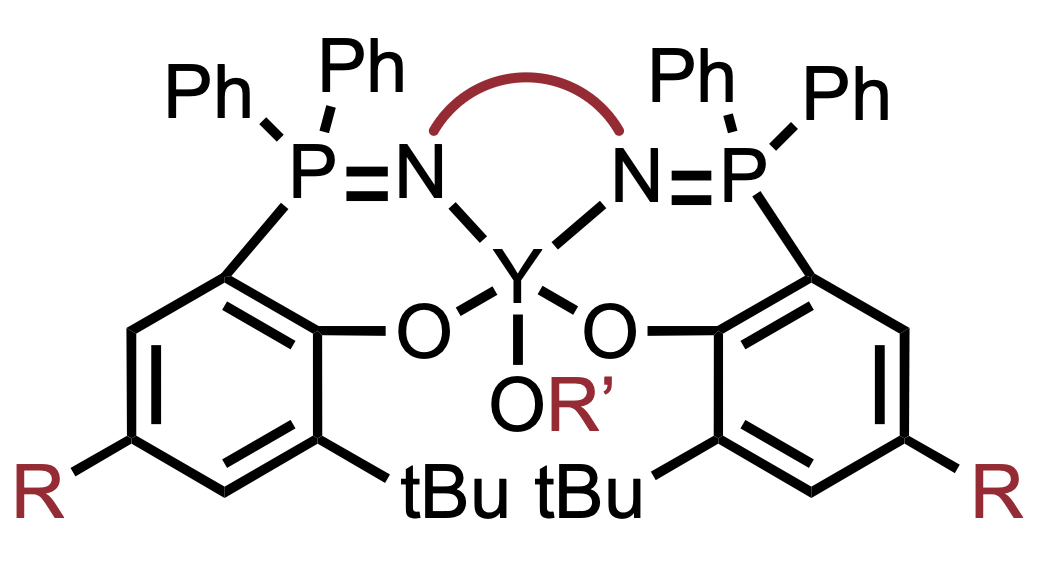
Figure 9. Structure of yttrium phosphasalen initiator complex for rac-lactide polymerization

One notable example of the use of iminophosphorane as ligands in catalyst complexes is the highly active yttrium phosphasalen initiator for rac-Lactide polymerization with excellent polymerization control, stereoselectivity, and rate of reaction. This effective initiator (Figure 9) is enabled by the use of a phosphasalen ligand, an iminophosphorane analog of the well-known salen ligand. The authors suggest that the strong 𝜎 and π donation to the electron deficient yttrium by the iminophosphorane (with greater electron donation relative to the "salen" ligand) allowed for higher rates of reaction by accelerating the rate of the lactide inversion step. The phosphasalene structure was also advantageous in that it could be modified to allow for high iso-selectivity or hetero-selectivity, eliminating the need for chiral ancillary ligands or complexes for stereocontrol.

There are many additional instances in literature of employing iminophosphoranes as ligands for various reactions including cross-coupling reactions (i.e. Sonogashira, Suzuki-Miyaura, Kumada-Corriu, and Negishi couplings), hydrogenation of alkenes, cyclopropanation, and other polymerization reactions. One example of a Kumada coupling catalyzed by a nickel complex with an iminophosphorine P, N, N-amido pincer ligand, reported in 2007, is show below in Figure 10.

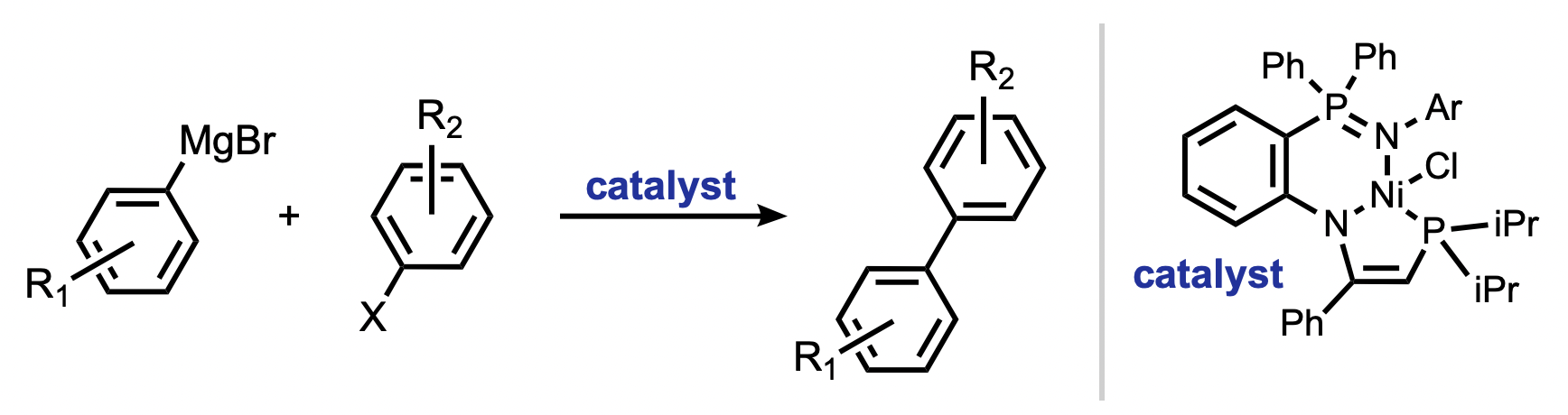
Figure 10. Kumada coupling catalyzed by an iminophosphorine P, N, N-amido pincer ligand-stabilized nickel catalyst

=== Bifunctional Iminophosphorane Catalysts ===
Bifunctional Brønsted base catalysts, with a separate Brønsted base and hydrogen bond donor moiety, are widely used for mediating enantioselective polar addition reactions with hundreds of reports to date. Such catalysts commonly employ a teritary amine as the Brønsted base, which imposes challenges in catalytic design due to the high acidity of the pronucleophile and moderate nucleophilicity of the conjugate base. In recent years, it was found that these limitations could be addressed by incorporating a superbasic iminophosphorane moiety, allowing for controlled tunability for good enantiocontrol and sufficient Brønsted basicity for good pronucleophile activation.

One of the earliest instances of such bifunctional iminophosphorane (BIMP) catalysts was reported by Dixon and coworkers in 2013, when a BIMP catalyst with a triaryliminophosphorane Brønsted base site was employed as a catalyst to achieve first general enantioselective nitro-Mannich reaction of nitromethane with N-DPP-protected ketimines (Figure 11), yielding the desired β-nitroamine in 3 hours whereas other bifunctional Brønsted tertiary amine-based catalysts did not yield product. The BIMP catalyst was highly tunable, with the substituted aryl groups on the iminophosphorane phosphorus being easily synthetically modified to control the pK_{BH+} and electronics of the superbase moiety.

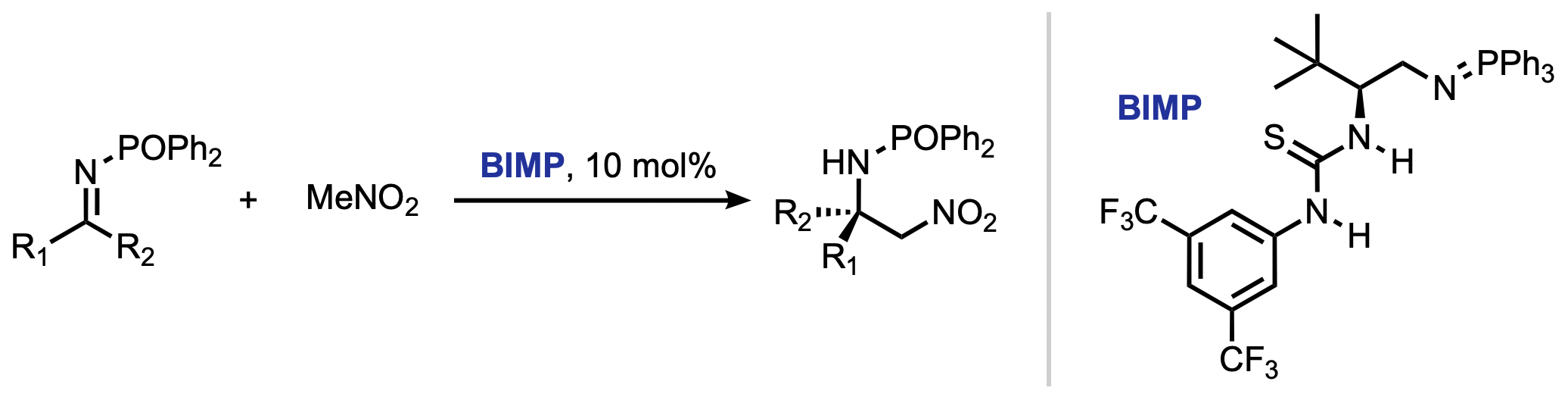
Figure 11. Bifunctional Iminophosphorane (BIMP) catalyzed enantioselective ketimine nitro-Mannich reaction

In recent years, BIMP catalysts have been employed across a number of reactions, with examples including the first enantioselective sulfa-Michael addition of alkyl thiols to unactivated α-substituted acrylate esters, ring-opening polymerization (ROP) of cyclic esters l-lactide (LA), δ-valerolactone (VL), and ε-caprolactone (CL) in 2014, and in total synthesis of the complex alkaloid natural product (-)-Himalensine A.

=== Bioorthogonal Chemistry ===
Iminophosphoranes have also found relevance in bioorthogonal chemistry. In 2000, Bertozzi and coworkers published a landmark paper on a variation of the Staudinger reaction, the Staudinger ligation, the first highly selective bioorthogonal reaction useful for labelling or modifying cellular environments, proteins, and DNA. The original Staudinger reaction between a phosphine and an azide was already a strong candidate for a cellular chemical probe since the reaction proceeds rapidly in biological conditions (aqueous, room temperature) and both compounds are abiotic and unreactive towards biological molecules. However, the iminophosphorane formed readily undergoes hydrolysis in aqueous environments, so an electrophilic trap was introduced in the phosphine to convert the iminophosphorane to a stable amide product (Figure 12). The authors demonstrated its potential for biological labelling by showing that azido-sugars could be reacted with this modified phosphine to produce the stable covalent adduct in cellular environments. The Staudinger ligation lay the foundation for the field of bioorthogonal chemistry and Bertozzi would later be awarded the 2022 Nobel Prize for this work.

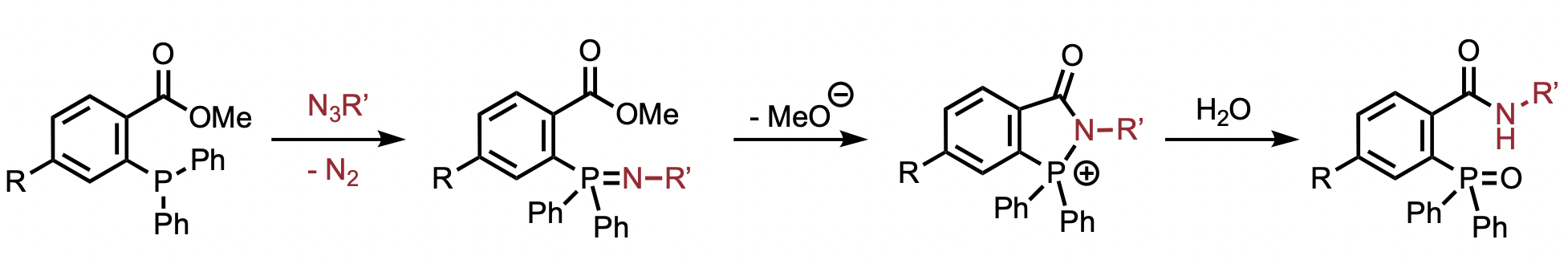
Figure 12. Staudinger ligation reaction involving an azide (i.e. azido-sugar) with a specially designed phosphine
