= Transition metal phosphinimide complexes =

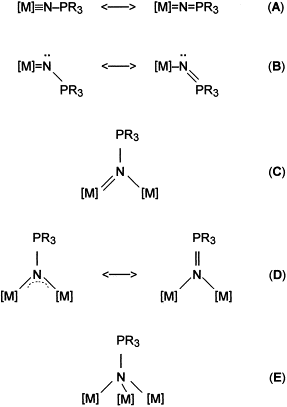
The possible bonding modes of phosphinimide ligands include: bridging - linear (A) or bent (B), μ^{2}-N-bridging – unsymmetrical (C) or symmetrical (D), and μ^{3}-N-bridging (E).

Transition metal phosphinimide complexes are metal complexes that contain phosphinimide ligands of the general formula NPR_{3}^{−} (R = organic substituent). Several coordination modes have been observed, including terminal and various bridging geometries. In the terminal bonding mode the M-N=P core is usually linear but some are quite bent. The preferred coordination type varies with the oxidation state and coligands on the metal and the steric and electronic properties of the R groups on phosphorus. Many transition metal phosphinimide complexes have been well-developed and, more recently, main group phosphinimide complexes have been synthesized.

== Complexes of Ti, Zr, V, Ta ==
Complexes of Phosphinimide are generally prepared by two routes. For highly electrophilic metal chlorides, the silyl derivative is convenient since is generates volatile trimethylsilyl chloride:

R_{3}PNSiMe_{3} + L_{n}MCl → R_{3}PN-ML_{n} + ClSiMe_{3}

CpTi(NPR_{3})Cl_{2} is prepared by this route.

More common are salt-elimination reactions:

R_{3}PNLi + L_{n}MCl → R_{3}PN-ML_{n} + LiCl

== Phosphinimide polyethylene catalysts ==
Phosphinimide ligands have shown promise in the area of ethylene polymerization. In terms of homogeneous catalysts, this field has been dominated by metallocene-based catalysts inspired by the Kaminsky catalyst in 1976. Initially phosphinimide ligands were suggested for polyethylene synthesis due to the fact they have similar steric and electronic properties to metallocene polyethylene catalysts.

In most respects the steric and electronic properties, of phosphinimides and cyclopentadienyl are comparable ligands. Metal bound t-Bu_{3}PN^{−} has a cone angle of 87° vs 83 for cylclopentadienyl. Compared to Cp, the bulky substituents of the phosphinimide ligand are more distant from the metal, which increase the exposure of the metal centre to substrate. The less sterically crowded metal centre appears to be particularly susceptible to deactivation however.

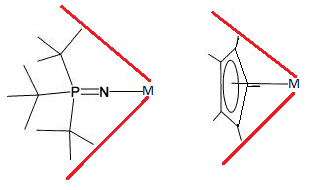
Cone angles of a tert-butyl phosphinimide ligands and cyclopentadienyl ligands when bonded to a metal centre

The precatalyst are prepared by alkylation and arylation of the phosphinimide complexes is possible through alkyllithium or Grignard reagents, giving products such as CpTi(NPR_{3})Me_{2}. The zirconium complexes (R_{3}PN)_{2}ZrCl_{2} can be alkylated or arylated through simple substitution. These organoTi and organoZr complexes are activated by treatment with MAO and B(C_{6}F_{5})_{3} as a cocatalyst to activate polymerization through methyl abstraction. The phosphinimide catalyst is thought to be homogeneous and single sited. It therefore produces reactivity comparable to metallocene catalysts which are also believed to be homogeneous, single sited catalysts. The catalytic process is assumed to proceed in much of the same way as metallocene based catalysts, as the chemistry is thought to occur primarily with the metal centre and not through the bulky ligands.
