= Tris(cyanoethyl)phosphine =

Names
- Preferred IUPAC name 3,3′,3′′-Phosphanetriyltripropanenitrile

Identifiers
CAS Number	4023-53-4
3D model (JSmol)	Interactive image
ChemSpider	70043
ECHA InfoCard	100.021.535
EC Number	223-687-0
PubChem CID	77639
UNII	846HYB5W2B
CompTox Dashboard (EPA)	DTXSID2063268
- InChI: InChI=1S/C9H12N3P/c10-4-1-7-13(8-2-5-11)9-3-6-12/h1-3,7-9H2 Key: CHZAMJVESILJGH-UHFFFAOYSA-N
- SMILES: C(CP(CCC#N)CCC#N)C#N

Properties
Chemical formula	C_{9}H_{12}N_{3}P
Molar mass	193.190 g·mol^{−1}
Appearance	white solid
Melting point	97 °C (207 °F; 370 K)

Hazards
- GHS labelling
Pictograms	(GHS06: Toxic) (GHS07: Exclamation mark) (GHS08: Health hazard)
Signal word	Danger
Hazard statements	H301, H302, H311, H315, H319, H330, H331, H335, H350
Precautionary statements	P201, P202, P260, P264, P270, P271, P280, P281, P284, P301+P310, P301+P312, P302+P352, P304+P340, P305+P351+P338, P308+P313, P310, P311, P312, P320, P321, P330, P332+P313, P337+P313, P361, P362, P363, P403+P233, P405, P501
- Except where otherwise noted, data are given for materials in their standard state (at 25 °C [77 °F], 100 kPa). Infobox references

Tris(cyanoethyl)phosphine is the organophosphorus compound with the formula P(CH_{2}CH_{2}CN)_{3}. It is white solid that is air stable, which is unusual for a trialkylphosphine. It is prepared by the hydrophosphination of acrylonitrile with phosphine. The compound has been the subject of much research. For example, it can be used to synthesize Tris(2-carboxyethyl)phosphine (TCEP), an effective reagent for the desulfurization of organic disulfides.
