= Kirsanov reaction =

The Kirsanov reaction is a method for the synthesis of certain organophosphorus compounds. In this reaction a tertiary phosphine is combined with a halogen and then an amine to give the iminophosphines, which are useful ligands and useful reagents. A typical reaction involves triphenylphosphine with bromine to give bromotriphenylphosphonium bromide:

Ph_{3}P + Br_{2} → Ph_{3}PBr^{+}Br^{−}

This salt, usually generated in situ, reacts with an excess of an alkylamine to give the iminophosphorane:

Ph_{3}PBr^{+}Br^{−} + 3 RNH_{2} → Ph_{3}PNR + 2 RNH_{3}^{+}Br^{−}

The method can be used when the conventional Staudinger reaction is not applicable, i.e. when the organic azide is not available to generate the iminophosphorane. Thus, it is used to make iminophosphoranes from alkyl amines.
