= Tetrakis(hydroxymethyl)phosphonium chloride =

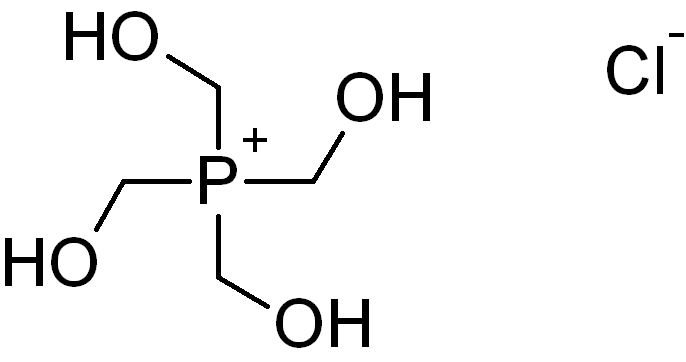

Names
- Preferred IUPAC name Tetrakis(hydroxymethyl)phosphonium chloride
- Other names Tetrahydroxymethylphosphonium chloride, THPC

Identifiers
CAS Number	124-64-1
ChEMBL	ChEMBL2131547
ChemSpider	29038
ECHA InfoCard	100.004.280
EC Number	204-707-7
PubChem CID	31298
RTECS number	TA2450000
UNII	58WB2XCF8I
UN number	2810
CompTox Dashboard (EPA)	DTXSID5021330

Properties
Chemical formula	C_{4}H_{12}ClO_{4}P
Molar mass	190.56 g·mol^{−1}
Appearance	White solid
Density	1.341 g/cm^{3}
Melting point	150 °C (302 °F; 423 K)

Hazards
- GHS labelling
Pictograms	(GHS05: Corrosive) (GHS06: Toxic) (GHS07: Exclamation mark) (GHS08: Health hazard) (GHS09: Environmental hazard)
Signal word	Danger
Hazard statements	H301, H302, H311, H312, H314, H315, H330, H334, H411
Precautionary statements	P260, P264, P270, P271, P273, P280, P284, P285, P301+P310, P301+P312, P301+P330+P331, P302+P352, P303+P361+P353, P304+P340, P304+P341, P305+P351+P338, P310, P312, P320, P321, P330, P332+P313, P342+P311, P361, P362, P363, P391, P403+P233, P405, P501
- Except where otherwise noted, data are given for materials in their standard state (at 25 °C [77 °F], 100 kPa). verify (what is ?) Infobox references

Tetrakis(hydroxymethyl)phosphonium chloride (THPC) is an organophosphorus compound with the chemical formula [P(CH_{2}OH)_{4}]Cl. It is a white water-soluble salt with applications as a precursor to fire-retardant materials and as a microbiocide in commercial and industrial water systems.

== Synthesis, structure, and reactions ==
THPC can be synthesized with high yield by treating phosphine with formaldehyde in the presence of hydrochloric acid.

PH_{3} + 4 H_{2}C=O + HCl → [P(CH_{2}OH)_{4}]Cl

The cation P(CH_{2}OH)_{4}^{+} features four-coordinate phosphorus, as is typical for phosphonium salts.

THPC converts to tris(hydroxymethyl)phosphine upon treatment with aqueous sodium hydroxide:

[P(CH_{2}OH)_{4}]Cl + NaOH → P(CH_{2}OH)_{3} + H_{2}O + H_{2}C=O + NaCl

== Application in textiles ==
THPC has industrial importance in the production of crease-resistant and flame-retardant finishes on cotton textiles and other cellulosic fabrics. A flame-retardant finish can be prepared from THPC by the Proban Process, in which THPC is treated with urea. The urea condenses with the hydroxymethyl groups on THPC. The phosphonium structure is converted to phosphine oxide as the result of this reaction.

[P(CH_{2}OH)_{4}]Cl + NH_{2}CONH_{2} → (HOCH_{2})_{2}P(O)CH_{2}NHC(O)NH_{2} + HCl + HCHO + H_{2} + H_{2}O

This reaction proceeds rapidly, forming insoluble high molecular weight polymers. The resulting product is applied to the fabrics in a "pad-dry process". This treated material is then treated with ammonia and ammonia hydroxide to produce fibers that are flame-retardant.

THPC can condense with many other types of monomers in addition to urea. These monomers include amines, phenols, and polybasic acids and anhydrides.
