= Wittig reagents =

Class of chemical compounds

In organic chemistry, Wittig reagents are organophosphorus compounds of the formula R_{3}P=CHR', where R is usually phenyl. They are used to convert ketones and aldehydes to alkenes:

== Preparation ==
Because they typically hydrolyze and oxidize readily, Wittig reagents are prepared using air-free techniques. They are typically generated and used in situ. THF is a typical solvent. Some are sufficiently stable to be sold commercially.

=== Formation of phosphonium salt ===
Wittig reagents are usually prepared from a phosphonium salt, which is in turn prepared by the quaternization of triphenylphosphine with an alkyl halide. Wittig reagents are usually derived from a primary alkyl halide. Quaternization of triphenylphosphine with secondary halides is typically inefficient. For this reason, Wittig reagents are rarely used to prepare tetrasubstituted alkenes.

=== Bases for deprotonation of phosphonium salts ===
The alkylphosphonium salt is deprotonated with a strong base such as n-butyllithium:

[Ph_{3}P^{+}CH_{2}R]X^{−} + C_{4}H_{9}Li → Ph_{3}P=CHR + LiX + C_{4}H_{10}

Besides n-butyllithium (^{n}BuLi), other strong bases like sodium and potassium t-butoxide (^{t}BuONa, ^{t}BuOK), lithium, sodium and potassium hexamethyldisilazide (LiHMDS, NaHMDS, KHDMS, where HDMS = N(SiMe_{3})_{2}), or sodium hydride (NaH) are also commonly used. For stabilized Wittig reagents bearing conjugated electron-withdrawing groups, even relatively weak bases like aqueous sodium hydroxide or potassium carbonate can be employed.

[Ph_{3}PCH_{3}]^{+}Br^{−}, typical phosphonium salt.

The identification of a suitable base is often an important step when optimizing a Wittig reaction. Because phosphonium ylides are seldom isolated, the byproduct(s) generated upon deprotonation essentially plays the role of an additive in a Wittig reaction. As a result, the choice of base has a strong influence on the efficiency and, when applicable, the stereochemical outcome of the Wittig reaction.

=== Substituent effects ===
Electron-withdrawing groups (EWGs) enhance the ease of deprotonation of phosphonium salts. This behavior is illustrated by the finding that deprotonation of triphenylcarbethoxymethylphosphonium requires only sodium hydroxide. The resulting triphenylcarbethoxymethylenephosphorane is somewhat air-stable. It is however less reactive than ylides lacking EWGs. For example they usually fail to react with ketones, necessitating the use of the Horner–Wadsworth–Emmons reaction as an alternative. Such stabilized ylides usually give rise to an E-alkene product when they react, rather than the more usual Z-alkene.

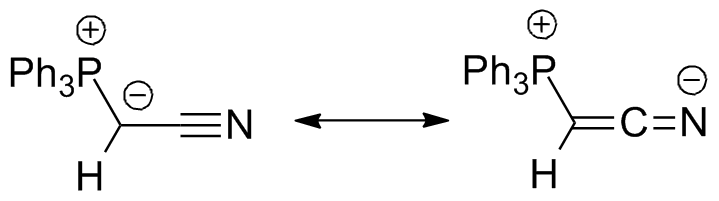
A "stabilized" Wittig reagent.

== Reactions ==
=== Olefination ===
Wittig reagents are used for olefination reactions, i.e. the Wittig reaction.

=== Protonation ===
Wittig reagents are prepared by deprotonation of alkyl phosphonium salts, and this reaction can be reversed. The methodology can be useful in the preparation of unusual Wittig reagents.

=== Alkylation ===
Alkylation of Ph_{3}P=CH_{2} with a primary alkyl halide R−CH_{2}−X, produces substituted phosphonium salts:

Ph_{3}P=CH_{2} + RCH_{2}X → Ph_{3}P^{+}CH_{2}CH_{2}R X^{−}

These salts can be deprotonated in the usual way to give Ph_{3}P=CH−CH_{2}R.

=== Deprotonation ===
Although ylides are "electron-rich", they are susceptible to deprotonation of alkyl substituents. Treatment of Me_{3}PCH_{2} with butyl lithium affords Me_{2}P(CH_{2})_{2}Li. Having carbanion-like properties, lithiated ylides function as ligands. Thus Me_{2}P(CH_{2})_{2}Li is a potential bidentate ligand.

== Examples ==
- (Chloromethylene)triphenylphosphorane
- Methoxymethylenetriphenylphosphorane
- Methylenetriphenylphosphorane
- Triphenylcarbethoxymethylenephosphorane
- Hexaphenylcarbodiphosphorane

== Structure ==
Wittig reagents are usually described as a combination of two resonance structures:

Ph_{3}P^{+}CR_{2}^{−} ↔ Ph_{3}P=CR_{2}

The former is called the ylide form and the latter is called the phosphorane form, which is the more familiar representation.

Crystallographic characterization of methylenetriphenylphosphorane shows that the phosphorus atom is tetrahedral. The PCH_{2} centre is planar and the P=CH_{2} distance is 1.661 Å, which is much shorter than the other P-C distances (1.823 Å). The CH_{2} group is trigonal planar (sp^{2} hybridized), with the lone pair occupying a primarily p character orbital. While this was initially attributed to pπ-dπ bonding, 3d orbital participation is now believed to be minor (as with d orbital participation in other "hypervalent" molecules), and this geometry is driven primarily by negative hyperconjugation (into a σ*_{P–Ph} orbital) and orbital polarization effects. Even so, the IUPAC endorses the phosphorane form as the standard depiction of a phosphorus ylide.
