= Methylenetriphenylphosphorane =

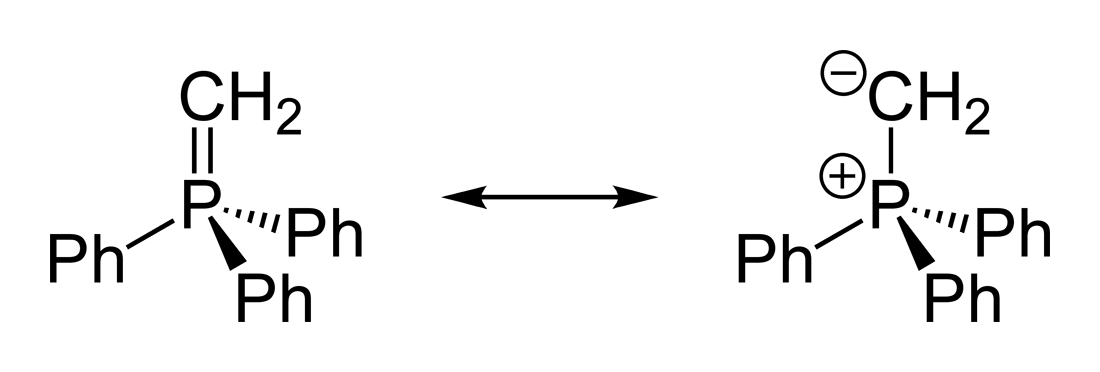

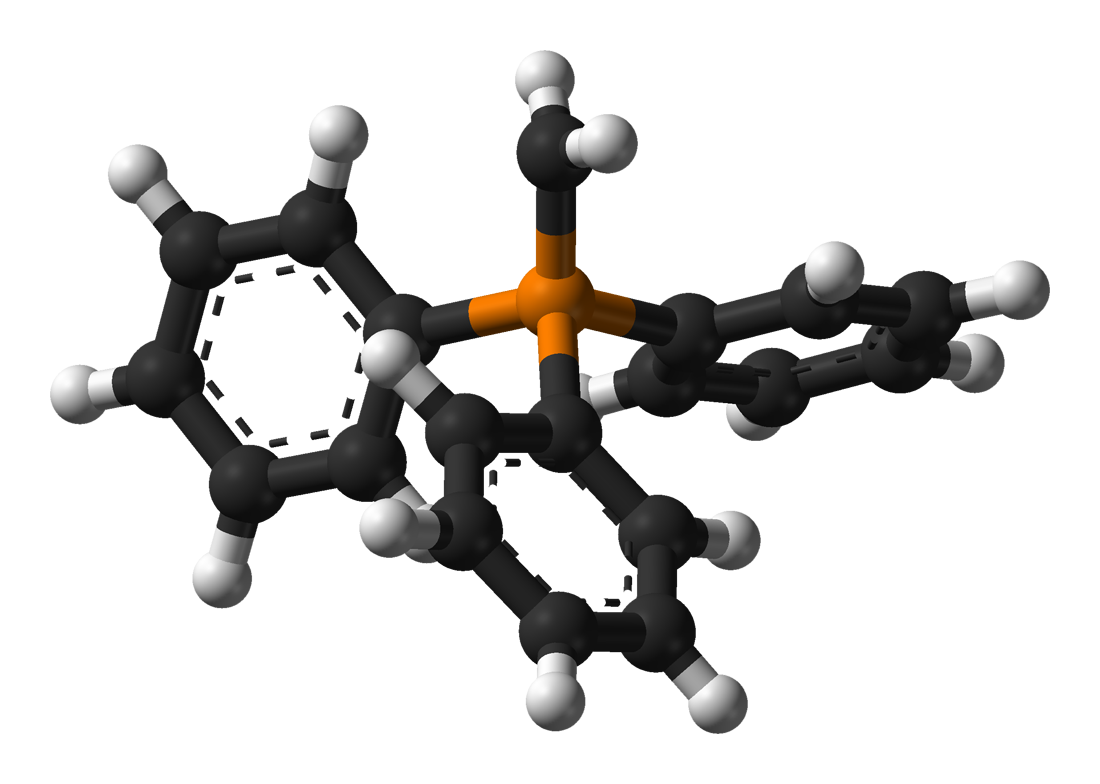

Names
- Preferred IUPAC name Methylidenetri(phenyl)phosphane

Identifiers
CAS Number	3487-44-3
3D model (JSmol)	Interactive image
ChemSpider	121606
PubChem CID	137960
UNII	8GN8K95F62
CompTox Dashboard (EPA)	DTXSID20188410
- InChI: InChI=1S/C19H17P/c1-20(17-11-5-2-6-12-17,18-13-7-3-8-14-18)19-15-9-4-10-16-19/h2-16H,1H2 Key: XYDYWTJEGDZLTH-UHFFFAOYSA-N; InChI=1/C19H17P/c1-20(17-11-5-2-6-12-17,18-13-7-3-8-14-18)19-15-9-4-10-16-19/h2-16H,1H2 Key: XYDYWTJEGDZLTH-UHFFFAOYAU
- SMILES: C=P(C1=CC=CC=C1)(C2=CC=CC=C2)C3=CC=CC=C3

Properties
Chemical formula	C_{19}H_{17}P
Appearance	yellow solid
Density	1.19 g/cm^{3}
Solubility in water	decompose
Solubility	THF
- Except where otherwise noted, data are given for materials in their standard state (at 25 °C [77 °F], 100 kPa). Infobox references

Methylenetriphenylphosphorane is an organophosphorus compound with the formula Ph_{3}PCH_{2}. It is the parent member of the phosphorus ylides, popularly known as Wittig reagents. It is a highly polar, highly basic species.

== Preparation and use ==
Methylenetriphenylphosphorane is prepared from methyltriphenylphosphonium bromide by its deprotonation using a strong base like butyllithium:

Ph_{3}PCH_{3}Br + BuLi → Ph_{3}PCH_{2} + LiBr + BuH

The phosphorane is generally not isolated, instead it is used in situ. The estimated pK_{a} of this carbon acid is near 15. Potassium tert-butoxide has been used in place of butyl lithium. Sodium amide has also been used a base.

Methylenetriphenylphosphorane is used to replace oxygen centres in aldehydes and ketones with a methylene group, i.e., a methylenation:

R_{2}CO + Ph_{3}PCH_{2} → R_{2}C=CH_{2} + Ph_{3}PO

The phosphorus-containing product is triphenylphosphine oxide.

== Structure ==
Crystallographic characterization of the colourless ylide reveals that the phosphorus atom is approximately tetrahedral. The PCH_{2} centre is planar and the P=CH_{2} distance is 1.661 Å, which is much shorter than the P-Ph distances (1.823 Å). The compound is usually described as a combination of two resonance structures:

Ph_{3}P^{+}CH_{2}^{−} ↔ Ph_{3}P=CH_{2}

== Uses ==
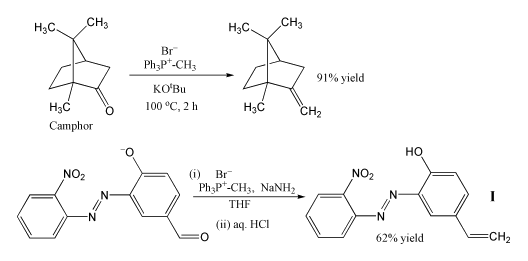
Two examples of the Wittig reaction using methylenetriphenylphosphorane

Methylenetriphenylphosphorane has become a standard tool for synthetic organic chemists.

== Related reagents ==
- (Chloromethylene)triphenylphosphorane
- Methoxymethylenetriphenylphosphine
- Carbomethoxymethylenetriphenylphosphorane
