= Tris(hydroxymethyl)phosphine =

Identifiers
CAS Number	2767-80-8
3D model (JSmol)	Interactive image
ChEMBL	ChEMBL279546
ChemSpider	68500
ECHA InfoCard	100.018.587
EC Number	220-445-6
PubChem CID	76001
UNII	Y6TG7WF7OQ
CompTox Dashboard (EPA)	DTXSID0062634
- InChI: InChI=1S/C3H9O3P/c4-1-7(2-5)3-6/h4-6H,1-3H2 Key: JMXMXKRNIYCNRV-UHFFFAOYSA-N
- SMILES: C(O)P(CO)CO

Properties
Chemical formula	C_{3}H_{9}O_{3}P
Molar mass	124.076 g·mol^{−1}
Appearance	white solid
Density	1.16 g/cm^{3}
Melting point	51–53 °C (124–127 °F; 324–326 K)
Boiling point	decomposes
Solubility in water	alcohols, dmf

Hazards
- GHS labelling
Pictograms	(GHS05: Corrosive) (GHS06: Toxic) (GHS07: Exclamation mark)
Signal word	Danger
Hazard statements	H301, H315, H318, H335
Precautionary statements	P261, P264, P264+P265, P270, P271, P280, P301+P316, P302+P352, P304+P340, P305+P354+P338, P317, P319, P321, P330, P332+P317, P362+P364, P403+P233, P405, P501
- Except where otherwise noted, data are given for materials in their standard state (at 25 °C [77 °F], 100 kPa). Infobox references

Tris(hydroxymethyl)phosphine is the organophosphorus compound with the formula P(CH_{2}OH)_{3}. It is a white solid. The compound is multifunctional, consisting of three alcohol functional groups and a tertiary phosphine. It is prepared by treating tetrakis(hydroxymethyl)phosphonium chloride with strong base:

[P(CH_{2}OH)_{4}]Cl + NaOH → P(CH_{2}OH)_{3} + H_{2}O + H_{2}C=O + NaCl

The compound can be prepared on a large scale using triethylamine as base and as solvent.

== Reactions ==
The compound forms complexes with a variety of metals. These complexes display some solubility in water but more so in methanol. The compound decomposes violently to phosphine and formaldehyde upon attempted distillation. In air, it oxidizes to the oxide.

Upon heating with hexamethylenetetramine, it converts to the water-soluble ligand 1,3,5-triaza-7-phosphaadamantane (PTA).

Tris(hydroxymethyl)phosphine is used, for example, in the synthesis of N-Boc-3-pyrroline by ring-closing metathesis using Grubbs' catalyst (bis(tricyclohexylphosphine)benzylidineruthenium dichloride). N-Boc-diallylamine is treated with Grubbs' catalyst, followed by catalyst poisoning by tris(hydroxymethyl)phosphine to facilitate product isolation. The carbon-carbon double bonds undergo ring closure, releasing ethene gas, resulting in N-Boc-3-pyrroline. The hydroxymethyl groups on tetrakis(hydroxymethyl)phosphonium chloride (THPC) undergo replacement reactions when THPC is treated with α,β-unsaturated nitrile, acid, amide and epoxides. For example, base induces condensation between THPC and acrylamide with displacement of the hydroxymethyl groups. (Z = CONH_{2})

[P(CH_{2}OH)_{4}]Cl + NaOH + 3 CH_{2}=CHZ → P(CH_{2}CH_{2}Z)_{3} + 4 CH_{2}O + H_{2}O + NaCl

Similar reactions occur when THPC is treated with acrylic acid; only one hydroxymethyl group is displaced, however.
