= Methylol urea =

Names
- Preferred IUPAC name N-(Hydroxymethyl)urea

Identifiers
CAS Number	1000-82-4
3D model (JSmol)	Interactive image
Beilstein Reference	1743129
ChEBI	CHEBI:16481
ChemSpider	13242
ECHA InfoCard	100.012.431
EC Number	213-674-8
Gmelin Reference	693876
KEGG	C06384
PubChem CID	13842
UNII	15BY095DMS
CompTox Dashboard (EPA)	DTXSID5027350
- InChI: InChI=1S/C2H6N2O2/c3-2(6)4-1-5/h5H,1H2,(H3,3,4,6) Key: VGGLHLAESQEWCR-UHFFFAOYSA-N
- SMILES: C(NC(=O)N)O

Properties
Chemical formula	C_{2}H_{6}N_{2}O_{2}
Molar mass	90.082 g·mol^{−1}
Appearance	white solid
Melting point	111 °C (232 °F; 384 K) decomposition

Hazards
- GHS labelling
Pictograms	(GHS07: Exclamation mark)
Signal word	Warning
Hazard statements	H315, H319, H335
Precautionary statements	P261, P264, P271, P280, P302+P352, P304+P340, P305+P351+P338, P312, P321, P332+P313, P337+P313, P362, P403+P233, P405, P501
- Except where otherwise noted, data are given for materials in their standard state (at 25 °C [77 °F], 100 kPa). Infobox references

Methylol urea is the organic compound with the formula H_{2}NC(O)NHCH_{2}OH. It is a white, water-soluble solid that decomposes near 110 °C.

Methylolurea is the product of the condensation reaction of formaldehyde and urea. As such it is an intermediate in the formation of urea-formaldehyde resins as well as fertilizer compositions such as methylene diurea. It has also been investigated as a corrosion inhibitor.
