= Staudinger reaction =

Chemical reaction

Named after	Hermann Staudinger
Reaction type	Organic redox reaction

Identifiers
Organic Chemistry Portal	staudinger-reaction
RSC ontology ID	RXNO:0000066

The Staudinger reaction is a chemical reaction of an organic azide with a phosphine or phosphite produces an iminophosphorane. The reaction was discovered by and named after Hermann Staudinger. The reaction follows this stoichiometry:

R_{3}P + R'N_{3} → R_{3}P=NR' + N_{2}

== Staudinger reduction ==
The Staudinger reduction is conducted in two steps. First phosphine imine-forming reaction is conducted involving treatment of the azide with the phosphine. The intermediate, e.g. triphenylphosphine phenylimide, is then subjected to hydrolysis to produce a phosphine oxide and an amine:

R_{3}P=NR' + H_{2}O → R_{3}P=O + R'NH_{2}

The overall conversion is a mild method of reducing an azide to an amine. Triphenylphosphine or tributylphosphine are most commonly used, yielding tributylphosphine oxide or triphenylphosphine oxide as a side product in addition to the desired amine. An example of a Staudinger reduction is the organic synthesis of the pinwheel compound 1,3,5-tris(aminomethyl)-2,4,6-triethylbenzene.

=== Reaction mechanism ===
The reaction mechanism centers around the formation of an iminophosphorane through nucleophilic addition of the aryl or alkyl phosphine at the terminal nitrogen atom of the organic azide and expulsion of diatomic nitrogen. The iminophosphorane is then hydrolyzed in the second step to the amine and a phosphine oxide byproduct.

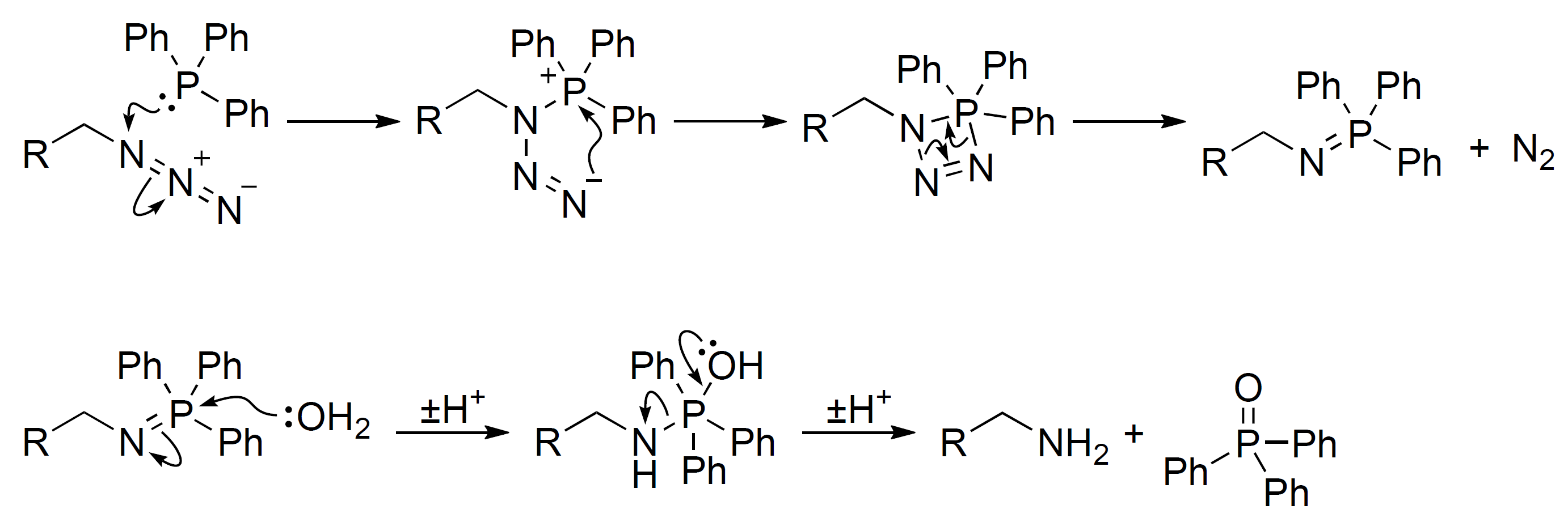
Reaction mechanism of Staudinger reaction and reduction

== Staudinger ligation ==
Of interest in chemical biology is the Staudinger ligation, which has been called one of the most important bioconjugation methods. Two versions of the Staudinger ligation have been developed. Both begin with the classic iminophosphorane reaction.

In the classical Staudinger ligation, the organophosphorus compound becomes incorporated into the nascent amide. Typically, appended to the organophosphorus component are reporter groups such as fluorophores. In the traceless Staudinger ligation, the organophosphorus group dissociates, giving a phosphorus-free peptide or bioconjugate.

Generic non-traceless Staudinger ligation. The organophosphorus reagent is entrained in the ligated product.

Generic traceless Staudinger ligation. The organophosphorus reagent is not entrained in the ligated product.
