= Bis(triphenylphosphine)iminium chloride =

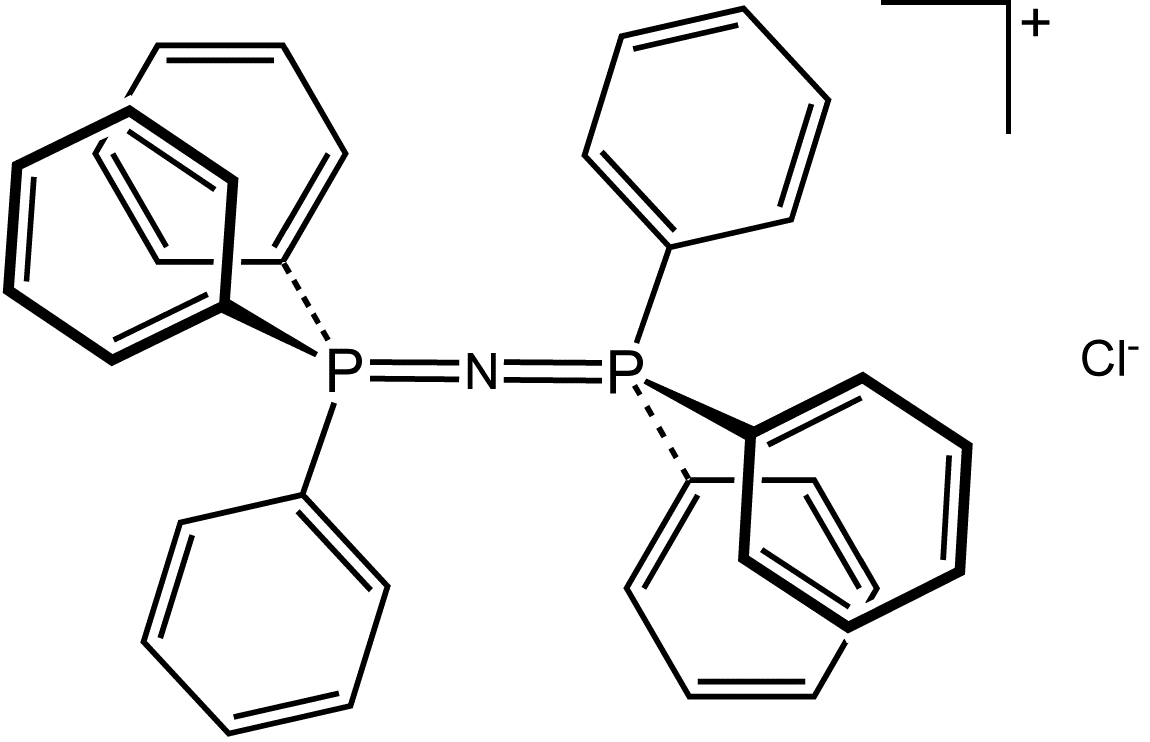

Names
- Preferred IUPAC name Hexaphenyl-1λ^{5}-diphosphaz-1-en-3-ium chloride
- Other names PNP chloride PPN chloride Bis(triphenylphosphine)iminium chloride Bis(triphenylphosphoranylidene)iminium chloride Bis(triphenylphosphoranylidene)ammonium chloride Hexaphenyldiphosphazenium chloride Selectophore

Identifiers
CAS Number	21050-13-5
3D model (JSmol)	Interactive image
ChemSpider	2300634
ECHA InfoCard	100.040.139
EC Number	244-170-6
PubChem CID	3036656
UNII	TP5P29DYA8
CompTox Dashboard (EPA)	DTXSID90201600
- InChI: InChI=1S/C36H30NP2.ClH/c1-7-19-31(20-8-1)38(32-21-9-2-10-22-32,33-23-11-3-12-24-33)37-39(34-25-13-4-14-26-34,35-27-15-5-16-28-35)36-29-17-6-18-30-36;/h1-30H;1H/q+1;/p-1 Key: LVRCYPYRKNAAMX-UHFFFAOYSA-M; InChI=1/C36H30NP2.ClH/c1-7-19-31(20-8-1)38(32-21-9-2-10-22-32,33-23-11-3-12-24-33)37-39(34-25-13-4-14-26-34,35-27-15-5-16-28-35)36-29-17-6-18-30-36;/h1-30H;1H/q+1;/p-1 Key: LVRCYPYRKNAAMX-REWHXWOFAO
- SMILES: [Cl-].N([P+](c1ccccc1)(c2ccccc2)c3ccccc3)=P(c4ccccc4)(c5ccccc5)c6ccccc6

Properties
Chemical formula	[((C_{6}H_{5})_{3}P)_{2}N]Cl
Molar mass	574.03 g/mol
Appearance	colourless solid
Melting point	260 to 262 °C (500 to 504 °F; 533 to 535 K)
Solubility in water	moderate

Hazards
- GHS labelling
Pictograms	(GHS07: Exclamation mark)
Signal word	Warning
Hazard statements	H315, H319, H332, H335
Precautionary statements	P261, P264, P271, P280, P302+P352, P304+P312, P304+P340, P305+P351+P338, P312, P321, P332+P313, P337+P313, P362, P403+P233, P405, P501

Related compounds
Related compounds	Tetraphenylarsonium chloride Tetrabutylammonium chloride
- Except where otherwise noted, data are given for materials in their standard state (at 25 °C [77 °F], 100 kPa). verify (what is ?) Infobox references

Bis(triphenylphosphine)iminium chloride is the chemical compound with the formula [((C_{6}H_{5})_{3}P)_{2}N]Cl, often abbreviated [(Ph_{3}P)_{2}N]Cl, where Ph is phenyl C_{6}H_{5}, or even abbreviated [PPN]Cl or [PNP]Cl or PPNCl or PNPCl, where PPN or PNP stands for (Ph_{3}P)_{2}N. This colorless salt is a source of the [(Ph_{3}P)_{2}N]^{+} cation (abbreviated PPN^{+} or PNP^{+}), which is used as an unreactive and weakly coordinating cation to isolate reactive anions. [(Ph_{3}P)_{2}N]^{+} is a phosphazene.

== Synthesis and structure ==
[(Ph_{3}P)_{2}N]Cl is prepared in two steps from triphenylphosphine Ph_{3}P:

Ph_{3}P + Cl_{2} → Ph_{3}PCl_{2}

This triphenylphosphine dichloride Ph_{3}PCl_{2} is related to phosphorus pentachloride PCl_{5}. Treatment of this species with hydroxylamine in the presence of Ph_{3}P results in replacement of the two single P–Cl bonds in Ph_{3}PCl_{2} by one double P=N bond:

2 Ph_{3}PCl_{2} + NH_{2}OH·HCl + Ph_{3}P → [(Ph_{3}P)_{2}N]Cl + 4HCl + Ph_{3}PO

Triphenylphosphine oxide Ph_{3}PO is a by-product.

Bis(triphenylphosphine)iminium chloride is described as [(Ph_{3}P)_{2}N]^{+}Cl^{−}. The structure of the bis(triphenylphosphine)iminium chloride [(Ph_{3}P)_{2}N]^{+}Cl^{−} is [Ph_{3}P=N=PPh_{3}]^{+}Cl^{−}. The P=N=P angle in the cation is flexible, ranging from ~130 to 180° depending on the salt. Bent and linear forms of the P=N=P connections have been observed in the same unit cell. The same shallow potential well for bending is observed in the isoelectronic species bis(triphenylphosphoranylidene)methane, Ph_{3}P=C=PPh_{3}, as well as the more distantly related molecule carbon suboxide, O=C=C=C=O. For the solvent-free chloride salt [(Ph_{3}P)_{2}N]Cl, the P=N=P bond angle was determined to be 133°. The two P=N bonds are equivalent, and their length is 1.597(2) Å.

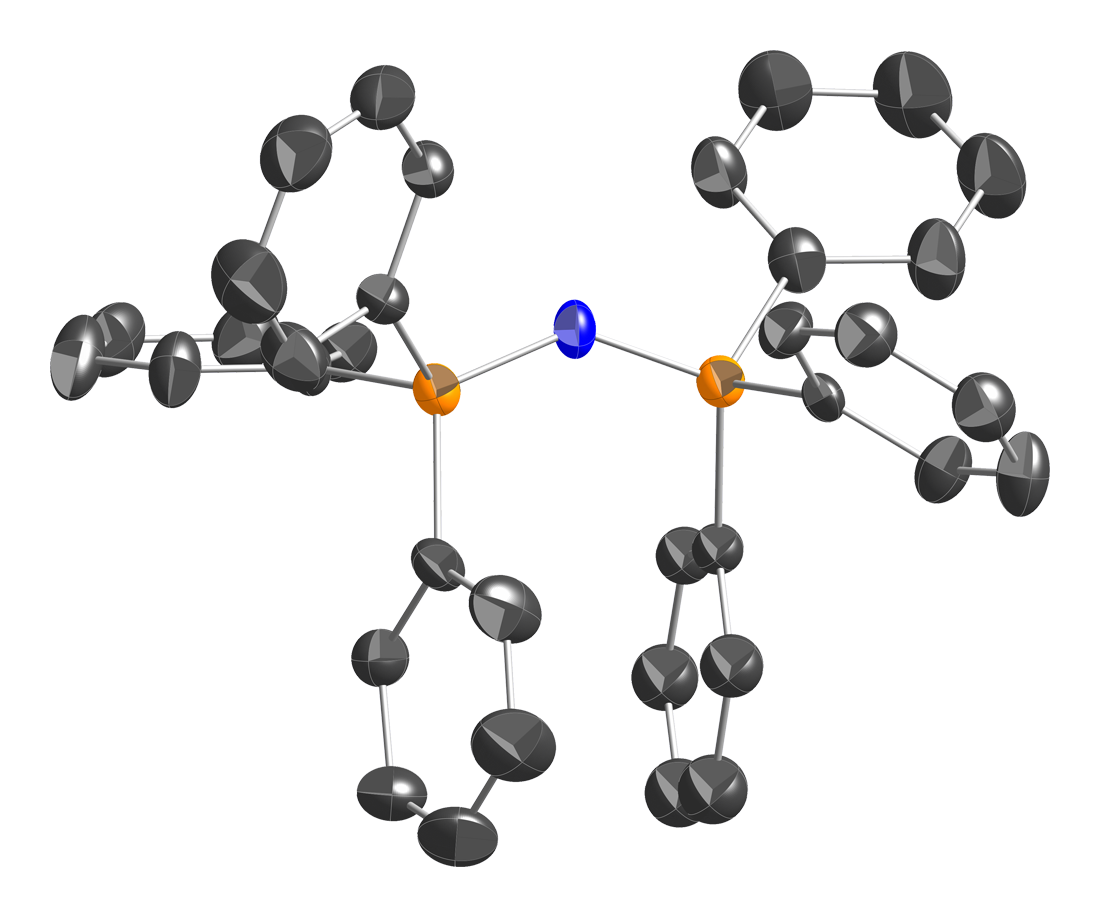
thermal ellipsoid model the bis(triphenylphosphine)iminium cation

== Use as reagent ==
In the laboratory, [(Ph_{3}P)_{2}N]Cl is the main precursor to [(Ph_{3}P)_{2}N]^{+} salts. Using salt metathesis reactions, nitrite, azide, and other small inorganic anions can be obtained with [(Ph_{3}P)_{2}N]^{+} cations. The resulting salts [(Ph_{3}P)_{2}N]^{+}NO^{−}_{2}, [(Ph_{3}P)_{2}N]^{+}N^{−}_{3}, etc. are soluble in polar organic solvents.

[(Ph_{3}P)_{2}N]^{+} forms crystalline salts with a range of anions that are otherwise difficult to crystallize. Its effectiveness is partially attributable to its rigidity, reflecting the presence of six phenyl rings. Often [(Ph_{3}P)_{2}N]^{+} forms salts that are more air-stable than salts with smaller cations such as those containing quaternary ammonium cation [NR_{4}]^{+}, or alkali metal cations. This effect is attributed to the steric shielding provided by this voluminous cation. Illustrative [(Ph_{3}P)_{2}N]^{+} salts of reactive anions include [(Ph_{3}P)_{2}N]^{+}[HFe(CO)_{4}]^{−}, [(Ph_{3}P)_{2}N]^{+}[Co(CO)_{4}]^{−}, ([(Ph_{3}P)_{2}N]^{+})_{2}[M_{2}(CO)_{10}]^{2+} (M = Cr, Mo, W), and [(Ph_{3}P)_{2}N]^{+}[Fe(CO)_{3}(NO)]^{−}. The role of ion pair in chemical reactions is often clarified by examination of the related salt derived from [(Ph_{3}P)_{2}N]^{+}.

== Related cations ==
A phosphazenium cation related to [(Ph_{3}P)_{2}N]^{+} is [(((CH_{3})_{2}N)_{3}P)_{2}N]^{+}.
