= Triphenylphosphine selenide =

Names
- Preferred IUPAC name Triphenyl-λ^{5}-phosphaneselone
- Other names triphenylphosphane selenide

Identifiers
CAS Number	3878-44-2
3D model (JSmol)	Interactive image
ChemSpider	263833
ECHA InfoCard	100.021.279
EC Number	223-406-1
PubChem CID	298720
UNII	T9S5RC2HL6
CompTox Dashboard (EPA)	DTXSID00959584
- InChI: InChI=1S/C18H15PSe/c20-19(16-10-4-1-5-11-16,17-12-6-2-7-13-17)18-14-8-3-9-15-18/h1-15H Key: ZFVJLNKVUKIPPI-UHFFFAOYSA-N
- SMILES: c1ccc(cc1)P(=[Se])(c2ccccc2)c3ccccc3

Properties
Chemical formula	C_{18}H_{15}PSe
Molar mass	341.25
Appearance	white solid
Melting point	186.5 to 187.5
Solubility in water	insoluble
Solubility	very soluble in dichloromethane, pyridine, and THF; moderately soluble on heating in acetonitrile, ethanol, and methanol; insoluble in ether
- Except where otherwise noted, data are given for materials in their standard state (at 25 °C [77 °F], 100 kPa). Infobox references

Triphenylphosphine selenide is an organophosphorus compound with the formula (C_{6}H_{5})_{3}PSe. It is a white solid which is soluble in most organic solvents. The compound is used in the preparation of other selenium compounds and is itself prepared by the reaction of triphenylphosphine with potassium selenocyanate. Single crystals have been isolated with both monoclinic and triclinic structures (space groups: P2_{1}/c and P1̅ respectively); in both cases the geometry at phosphorus is tetrahedral.

== See also ==
- Triphenylphosphine oxide
- Triphenylphosphine sulfide
- Trioctylphosphine selenide
