= Lithium diphenylphosphide =

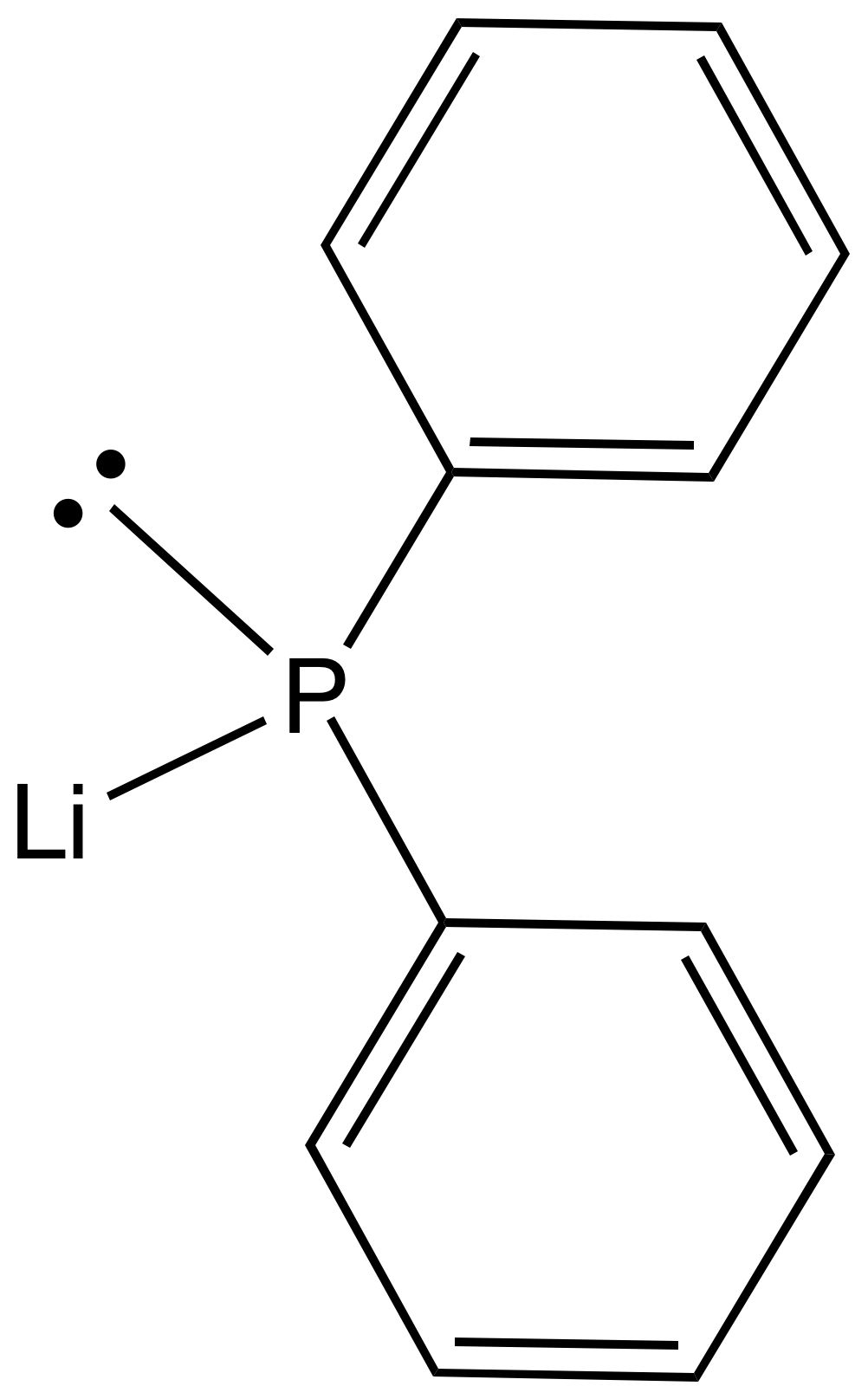

Names
- Preferred IUPAC name Lithium diphenylphosphanide

Identifiers
CAS Number	4541-02-0
3D model (JSmol)	Interactive image
ChemSpider	2719164
PubChem CID	3478053
CompTox Dashboard (EPA)	DTXSID80392839
- InChI: InChI=1S/C12H10P.Li/c1-3-7-11(8-4-1)13-12-9-5-2-6-10-12;/h1-10H;/q-1;+1 Key: WKUYEGHEUWHKIU-UHFFFAOYSA-N
- SMILES: [Li+].C1=CC=C(C=C1)[P-]C2=CC=CC=C2

Properties
Chemical formula	C_{12}H_{10}LiP
Molar mass	192.13 g·mol^{−1}
Appearance	pale yellow solid
Solubility in water	Reacts with water
Solubility	Ethers, hydrocarbons

Hazards
- GHS labelling
Pictograms	(GHS05: Corrosive) (GHS07: Exclamation mark) (GHS09: Environmental hazard)
Signal word	Danger
Hazard statements	H302, H312, H314, H332, H410
Precautionary statements	P260, P264, P270, P271, P273, P280, P301+P312, P301+P330+P331, P302+P352, P303+P361+P353, P304+P312, P304+P340, P305+P351+P338, P310, P312, P321, P322, P330, P363, P391, P405, P501
- Except where otherwise noted, data are given for materials in their standard state (at 25 °C [77 °F], 100 kPa). Infobox references

Lithium diphenylphosphide contains lithium and the organophosphorus anion with the formula (C_{6}H_{5})_{2}PLi. It is a red, air-sensitive solid that is used in the preparation of diphenylphosphino compounds.

== Synthesis and reactions ==
The lithium, sodium, and potassium salts are prepared by reduction of chlorodiphenylphosphine, triphenylphosphine, or tetraphenyldiphosphine with alkali metals (M):

(C_{6}H_{5})_{2}PCl + 2 M → (C_{6}H_{5})_{2}PM + MCl
(C_{6}H_{5})_{3}P + 2 M → (C_{6}H_{5})_{2}PM + MC_{6}H_{5}
(C_{6}H_{5})_{4}P_{2} + 2 M → 2 (C_{6}H_{5})_{2}PM

They can also be obtained by deprotonation of diphenylphosphine.

With water, the salts convert to diphenylphosphine:

(C_{6}H_{5})_{2}PLi + H_{2}O → (C_{6}H_{5})_{2}PH + LiOH

With halocarbons, the salts react to give tertiary phosphines:

(C_{6}H_{5})_{2}PM + RX → (C_{6}H_{5})_{2}PR + MX

When treated with metal halides, lithium diphenylphosphide gives transition metal phosphido complexes.

== Structure and physical properties ==
Although treated as salts, alkali diphenylphosphides are highly aggregated in solution. They adopt polymeric structures as solids.

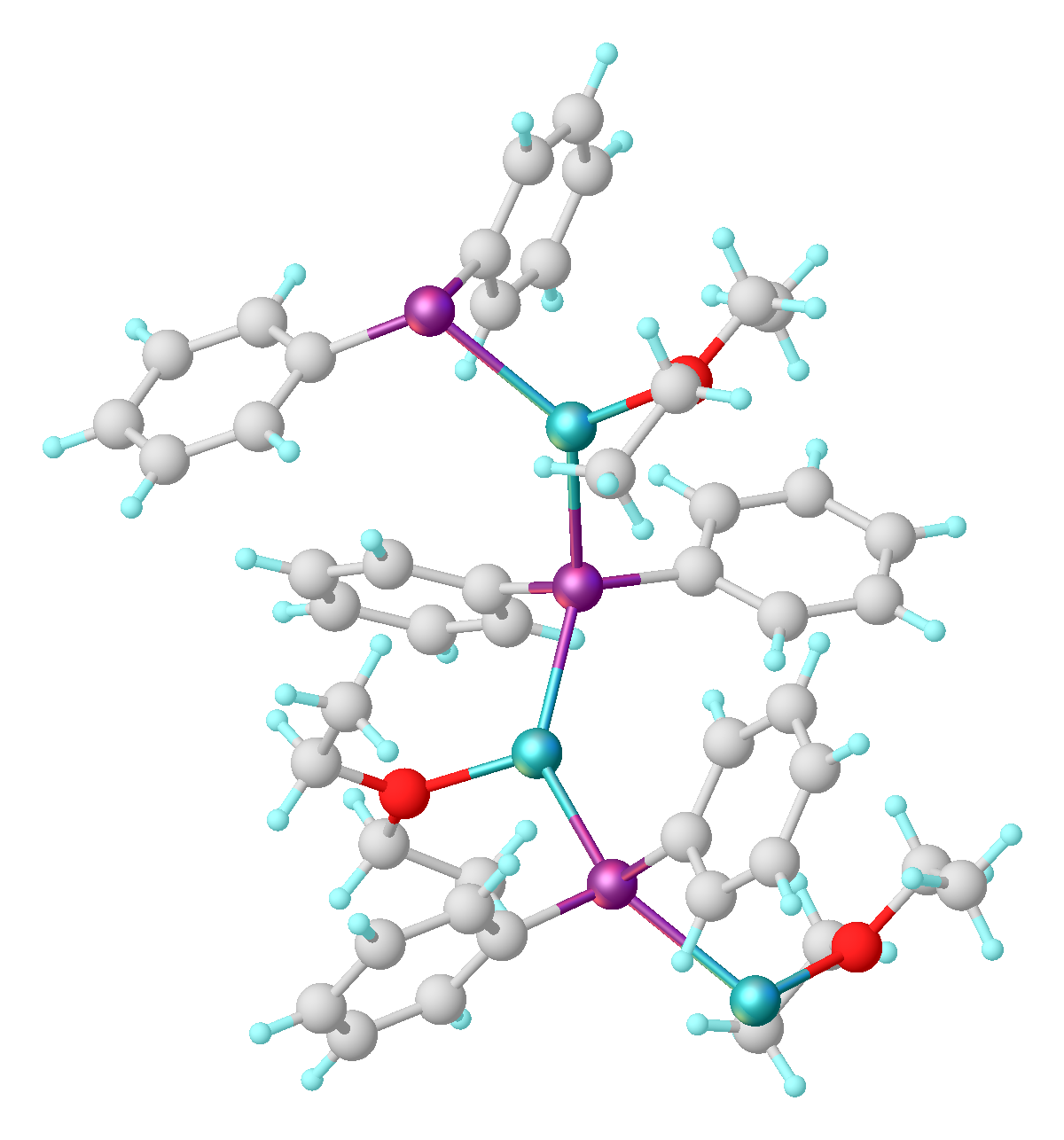
Part of the polymeric structure of LiPPh_{2}(Et_{2}O).

As an ether complex, the lithium salt is dark red.

== Related compounds ==
- Sodium diphenylphosphide (CAS RN 4376-01-6)
- Potassium diphenylphosphide (CAS RN 15475-27-1)
