= Triphenylphosphine =

- Skeletal structure

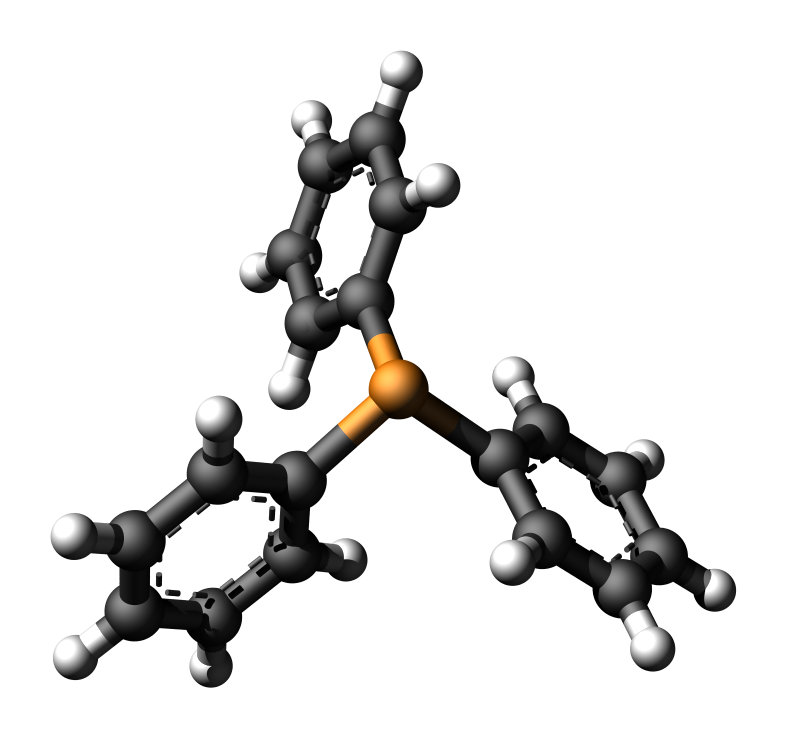
- Ball-and-stick model of the triphenylphosphine molecule

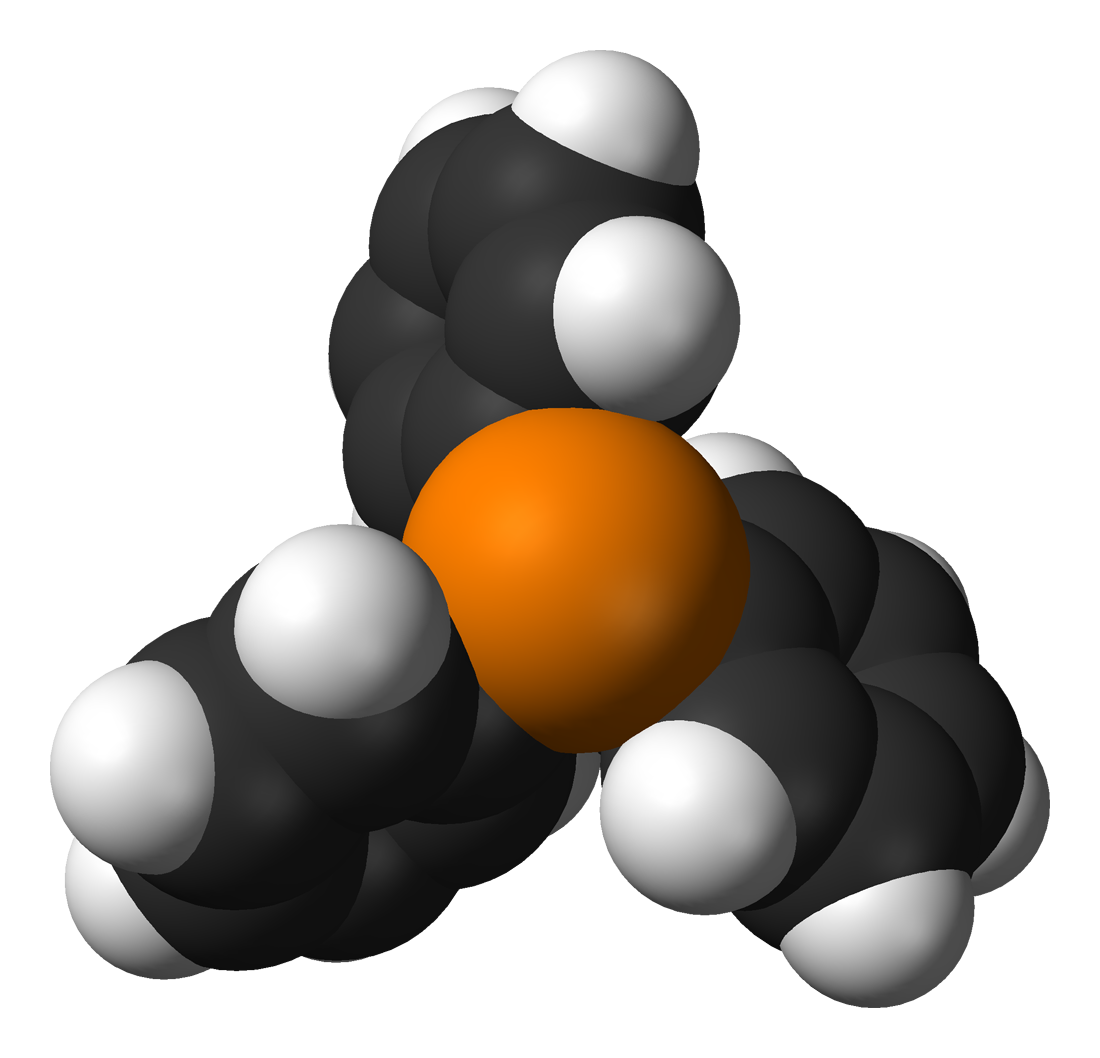
- Space-filling structure of PPh_{3}

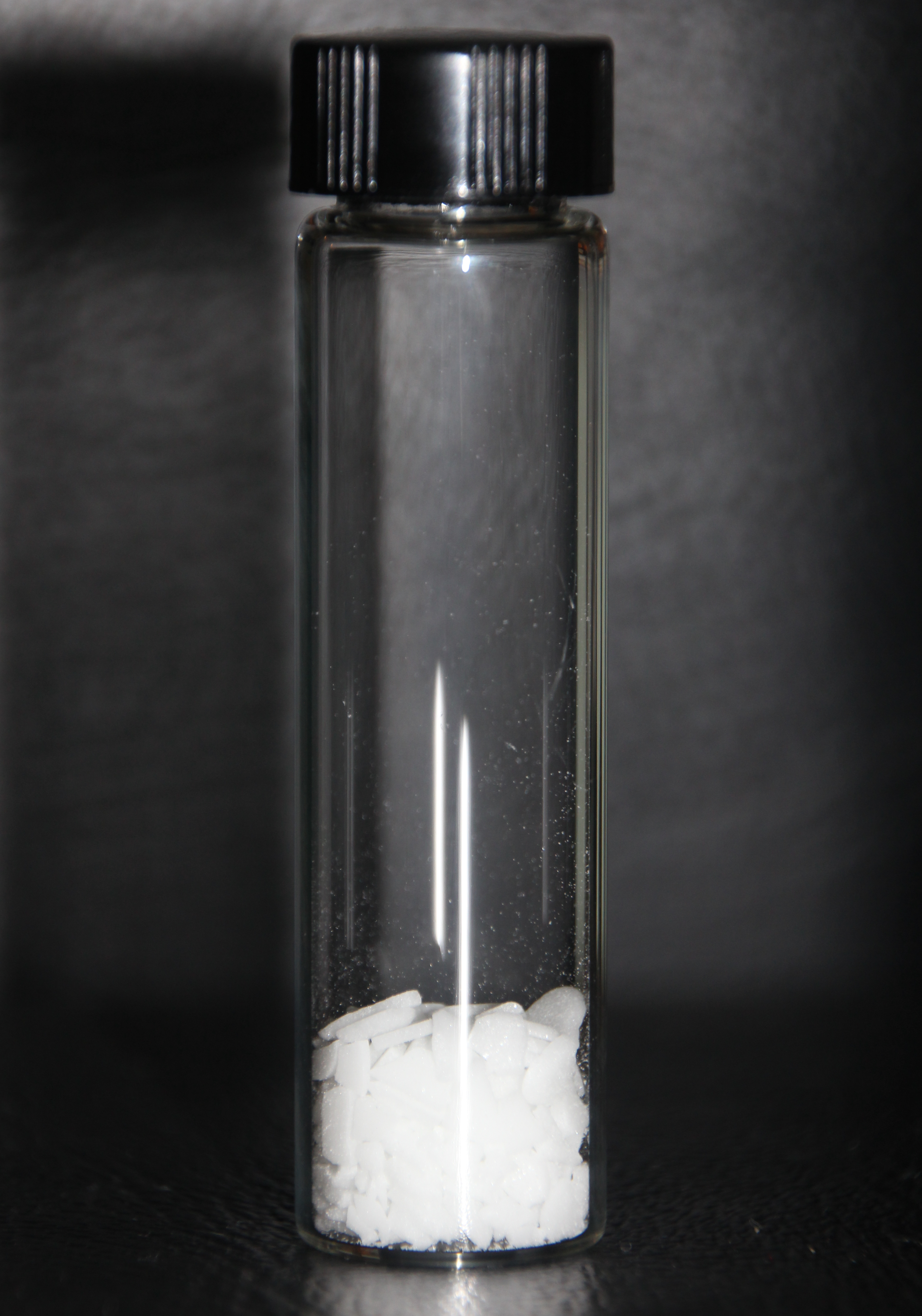

Names
- Preferred IUPAC name Triphenylphosphane

Identifiers
CAS Number	603-35-0
3D model (JSmol)	Interactive image
ChEBI	CHEBI:183318
ChemSpider	11283
ECHA InfoCard	100.009.124
EC Number	210-036-0
PubChem CID	11776
RTECS number	SZ3500000
UNII	26D26OA393
UN number	3077
CompTox Dashboard (EPA)	DTXSID5026251
- InChI: InChI=1S/C18H15P/c1-4-10-16(11-5-1)19(17-12-6-2-7-13-17)18-14-8-3-9-15-18/h1-15H Key: RIOQSEWOXXDEQQ-UHFFFAOYSA-N; InChI=1/C18H15P/c1-4-10-16(11-5-1)19(17-12-6-2-7-13-17)18-14-8-3-9-15-18/h1-15H Key: RIOQSEWOXXDEQQ-UHFFFAOYAH
- SMILES: c1ccccc1P(c2ccccc2)c3ccccc3

Properties
Chemical formula	C_{18}H_{15}P
Molar mass	262.292 g·mol^{−1}
Appearance	White Solid
Density	1.194 g cm^{−3}, solid
Melting point	80 °C (176 °F; 353 K)
Boiling point	377 °C (711 °F; 650 K)
Solubility in water	Insoluble
Solubility	organic solvents
Acidity (pK_{a})	7.64 (pK_{a} of conjugate acid in acetonitrile) 2.73 (pK_{a} of conjugate acid, aqueous scale)
Magnetic susceptibility (χ)	-166.8·10^{−6} cm^{3}/mol
Refractive index (n_{D})	1.59; ε_{r}, etc.

Structure
Molecular shape	Pyramidal
Dipole moment	1.4 - 1.44 D

Hazards
- GHS labelling
Pictograms	(GHS07: Exclamation mark) (GHS08: Health hazard)
Signal word	Danger
Hazard statements	H302, H317, H350, H412
Precautionary statements	P201, P202, P261, P264, P270, P272, P273, P280, P281, P301+P312, P302+P352, P308+P313, P321, P330, P333+P313, P363, P405, P501
NFPA 704 (fire diamond)	2 1 2
Flash point	180 °C (356 °F; 453 K)
Safety data sheet (SDS)	Fisher Scientific

Related compounds
Related tertiary phosphines	Trimethylphosphine; Phosphine
Related compounds	Triphenylamine; Triphenylarsine; Triphenylstibine; Triphenylphosphine oxide Triphenylphosphine sulfide Triphenylphosphine dichloride Triphenylphosphine selenide Pd(PPh_{3})_{4}
- Except where otherwise noted, data are given for materials in their standard state (at 25 °C [77 °F], 100 kPa). verify (what is ?) Infobox references

Triphenylphosphine (IUPAC name: triphenylphosphane) is a common organophosphorus compound with the formula P(C_{6}H_{5})_{3} and often abbreviated to PPh_{3} or Ph_{3}P. It is a versatile compound that is widely used as a reagent in organic synthesis and as a ligand for transition metal complexes, including ones that serve as catalysts in organometallic chemistry. PPh_{3} exists as relatively air stable, colorless crystals at room temperature. It dissolves in non-polar organic solvents such as benzene and diethyl ether.

== Preparation and structure ==
Triphenylphosphine can be prepared in the laboratory by treatment of phosphorus trichloride with phenylmagnesium bromide or phenyllithium. The industrial synthesis involves the reaction between phosphorus trichloride, chlorobenzene, and sodium:

PCl_{3} + 3 PhCl + 6 Na → PPh_{3} + 6 NaCl

Triphenylphosphine crystallizes in triclinic and monoclinic modification. In both cases, the molecule adopts a pyramidal structure with propeller-like arrangement of the three phenyl groups.

== Principal reactions with chalcogens, halogens, and acids ==
=== Oxidation ===
Triphenylphosphine undergoes slow oxidation by air to give triphenylphosphine oxide, Ph_{3}PO:

2 PPh_{3} + O_{2} → 2 Ph_{3}PO

This impurity can be removed by recrystallisation of PPh_{3} from either hot ethanol or isopropanol. This method capitalizes on the fact that OPPh_{3} is more polar and hence more soluble in polar solvents than PPh_{3}.

One electron oxidation generates the triphenylphosphonium radical cation, which dimerizes to the hexaphenyl-1,2-diphosphonium dication [Ph_{3}P–PPh_{3}]^{2+}. Irradiation by light cleaves the P–P bond and regenerates transient triphenylphosphonium radical cations.

Triphenylphosphine abstracts sulfur from polysulfide compounds, episulfides, and elemental sulfur. Simple organosulfur compounds such as thiols and thioethers are unreactive, however. The phosphorus-containing product is triphenylphosphine sulfide, Ph_{3}PS. This reaction can be employed to assay the "labile" S^{0} content of a sample, say vulcanized rubber. Triphenylphosphine selenide, Ph_{3}PSe, may be easily prepared via treatment of PPh_{3} with red (alpha-monoclinic) Se. Salts of selenocyanate, SeCN^{−}, are used as the Se^{0} source. PPh_{3} can also form an adduct with Te, although this adduct primarily exists as (Ph_{3}P)_{2}Te rather than PPh_{3}Te.

Aryl azides react with PPh_{3} to give phosphanimines, analogues of OPPh_{3}, via the Staudinger reaction. Illustrative is the preparation of triphenylphosphine phenylimide:

PPh_{3} + PhN_{3} → PhNPPh_{3} + N_{2}

The phosphanimine can be hydrolyzed to the amine. Typically the intermediate phosphanimine is not isolated.

PPh_{3} + RN_{3} + H_{2}O → OPPh_{3} + N_{2} + RNH_{2}

=== Chlorination ===
Cl_{2} adds to PPh_{3} to give triphenylphosphine dichloride ([PPh_{3}Cl]Cl), which exists as the moisture-sensitive phosphonium halide. This reagent is used to convert alcohols to alkyl chlorides in organic synthesis. Bis(triphenylphosphine)iminium chloride (PPN^{+}Cl^{−}, formula [(C_{6}H_{5})_{3}P)_{2}N]Cl is prepared from triphenylphosphine dichloride:

2 Ph_{3}PCl_{2} + NH_{2}OH·HCl + Ph_{3}P → {[Ph_{3}P]_{2}N}Cl + 4HCl + Ph_{3}PO

=== Protonation ===
PPh_{3} is a weak base (aqueous pK_{aH} = 2.73, determined electrochemically), although it is a considerably stronger base than NPh_{3} (estimated aqueous pK_{aH} < −3). It forms isolable triphenylphosphonium salts with strong acids such as HBr:

P(C_{6}H_{5})_{3} + HBr → [HP(C_{6}H_{5})_{3}]^{+}Br^{−}

== Organic reactions ==
PPh_{3} is widely used in organic synthesis. The properties that guide its usage are its nucleophilicity and its reducing character. The nucleophilicity of PPh_{3} is indicated by its reactivity toward electrophilic alkenes, such as Michael-acceptors, and alkyl halides. It is also used in the synthesis of biaryl compounds, such as the Suzuki reaction.

=== Quaternization ===
PPh_{3} combines with alkyl halides to give phosphonium salts. This quaternization reaction is particularly fast for benzylic and allylic halides:

PPh_{3} + CH_{3}I → [CH_{3}PPh_{3}]^{+}I^{−}

These salts, which can often be isolated as crystalline solids, react with strong bases to form ylides, which are reagents in the Wittig reactions.

Aryl halides will quaternize PPh_{3} to give tetraphenylphosphonium salts:

PPh_{3} + PhBr → [PPh_{4}]Br

The reaction however requires elevated temperatures and metal catalysts.

=== Mitsunobu reaction ===
In the Mitsunobu reaction, a mixture of triphenylphosphine and diisopropyl azodicarboxylate ("DIAD", or its diethyl analogue, DEAD) converts an alcohol and a carboxylic acid to an ester. DIAD is reduced as it serves as the hydrogen acceptor, and the PPh_{3} is oxidized to OPPh_{3}.

=== Appel reaction ===
In the Appel reaction, a mixture of PPh_{3} and CX_{4} (X = Cl, Br) is used to convert alcohols to alkyl halides. Triphenylphosphine oxide (OPPh_{3}) is a byproduct.

PPh_{3} + CBr_{4} + RCH_{2}OH → OPPh_{3} + RCH_{2}Br + HCBr_{3}

This reaction commences with nucleophilic attack of PPh_{3} on CBr_{4}, an extension of the quaternization reaction listed above.

=== Deoxygenation ===
The easy oxygenation of PPh_{3} is exploited in its use to deoxygenate organic peroxides, which generally occurs with retention of configuration:

PPh_{3} + RO_{2}H → OPPh_{3} + ROH (R = alkyl)

It is also used for the decomposition of organic ozonides to ketones and aldehydes, although dimethyl sulfide is more popular for the reaction as the side product, dimethyl sulfoxide is more readily separated from the reaction mixture than triphenylphosphine oxide. Aromatic N-oxides are reduced to the corresponding amine in high yield at room temperature with irradiation:

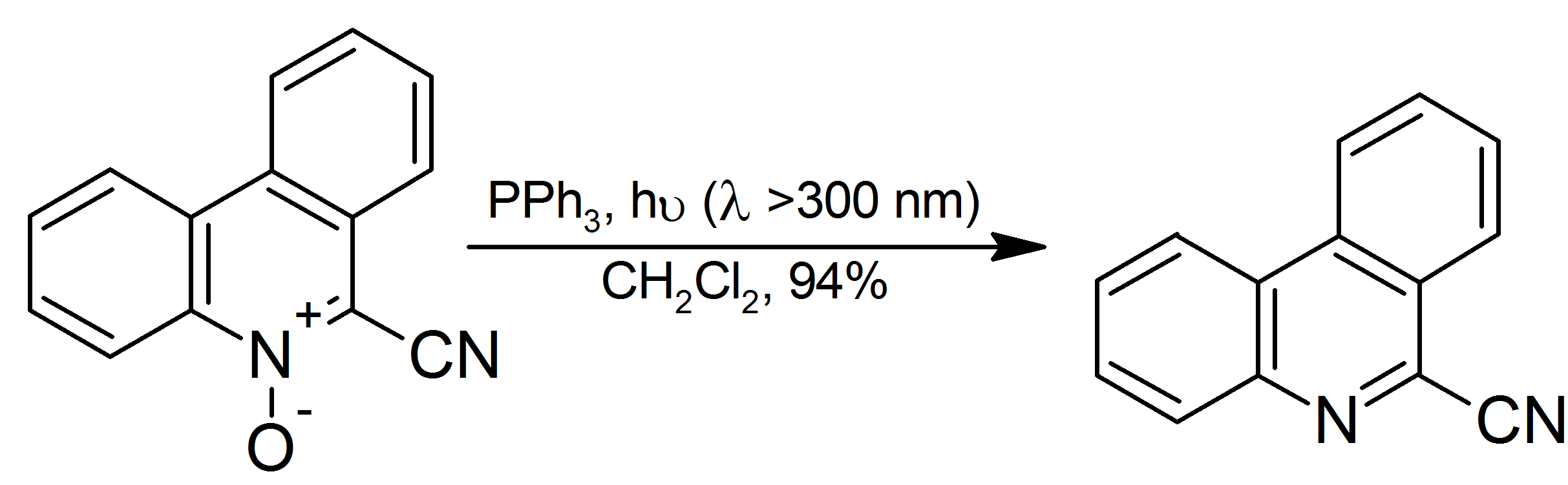

=== Sulfonation ===
Sulfonation of PPh_{3} gives tris(3-sulfophenyl)phosphine, P(C_{6}H_{4}-3-SO_{3}^{−})_{3} (TPPTS), usually isolated as the trisodium salt. In contrast to PPh_{3}, TPPTS is water-soluble, as are its metal derivatives. Rhodium complexes of TPPTS are used in certain industrial hydroformylation reactions.

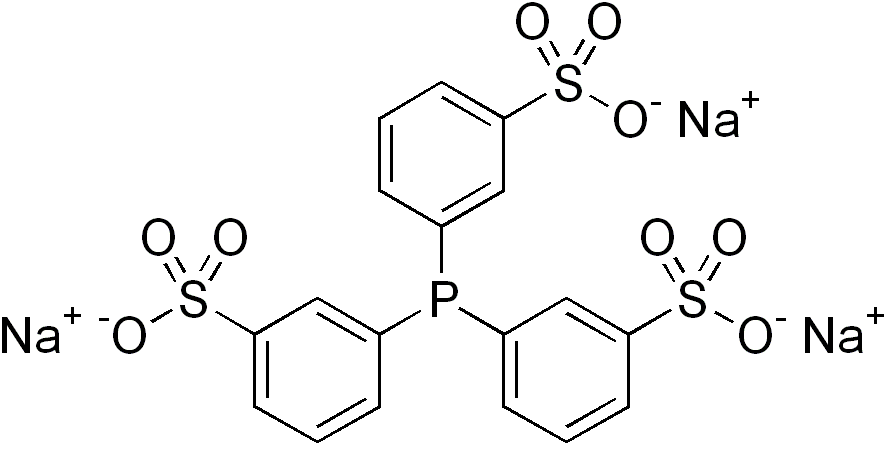
3,3′,3″-Phosphanetriyltris(benzenesulfonic acid) trisodium salt is a water-soluble derivative of triphenylphosphine.

=== Reduction to diphenylphosphide ===
Lithium in THF as well as Na or K react with PPh_{3} to give Ph_{2}PM (M = Li, Na, K). These salts are versatile precursors to tertiary phosphines. For example, 1,2-dibromoethane and Ph_{2}PM react to give Ph_{2}PCH_{2}CH_{2}PPh_{2}. Weak acids such ammonium chloride, convert Ph_{2}PM (M = Li, Na, K) into diphenylphosphine:

(C_{6}H_{5})_{2}PM + H_{2}O → (C_{6}H_{5})_{2}PH + MOH

== Transition metal complexes ==
Triphenylphosphine binds well to most transition metals, especially those in the middle and late transition metals of groups 7–10. In terms of steric bulk, PPh_{3} has a Tolman cone angle of 145°, which is intermediate between those of P(C_{6}H_{11})_{3} (170°) and P(CH_{3})_{3} (115°). In an early application in homogeneous catalysis, NiBr_{2}(PPh_{3})_{2} was used by Walter Reppe for the synthesis of acrylate esters from alkynes, carbon monoxide, and alcohols. The use of PPh_{3} was popularized by its use in the hydroformylation catalyst RhH(PPh_{3})_{3}(CO).

== Polymer-anchored PPh_{3} derivatives ==
Polymeric analogues of PPh_{3} are known whereby polystyrene is modified with PPh_{2} groups at the para position. Such polymers can be employed in many of the applications used for PPh_{3} with the advantage that the polymer, being insoluble, can be separated from products by simple filtration of reaction slurries. Such polymers are prepared via treatment of 4-lithiophenyl-substituted polystyrene with chlorodiphenylphosphine (PPh_{2}Cl).

== See also ==
- Tris(o-tolyl)phosphine
- Decyl(triphenyl)phosphonium
- Vaska's complex
- Wilkinson's catalyst
- Bis(triphenylphosphine)nickel(II) dichloride
- Bis(triphenylphosphine)palladium(II) dichloride
- Stryker's reagent
