= 1,5-Bis(diphenylphosphino)pentane =

Names
- Preferred IUPAC name (Butane-1,4-diyl)bis(diphenylphosphane)
- Other names DPPP

Identifiers
CAS Number	27721-02-4
3D model (JSmol)	Interactive image
Abbreviations	dpppe
ChEMBL	ChEMBL68967
ChemSpider	2015213
ECHA InfoCard	100.154.700
EC Number	626-285-7
PubChem CID	2733414
CompTox Dashboard (EPA)	DTXSID80369900
- InChI: InChI=1S/C29H30P2/c1-6-16-26(17-7-1)30(27-18-8-2-9-19-27)24-14-5-15-25-31(28-20-10-3-11-21-28)29-22-12-4-13-23-29/h1-4,6-13,16-23H,5,14-15,24-25H2 Key: MZFPAWGWFDGCHP-UHFFFAOYSA-N
- SMILES: C1=CC=C(C=C1)P(CCCCCP(C2=CC=CC=C2)C3=CC=CC=C3)C4=CC=CC=C4

Properties
Chemical formula	C_{29}H_{30}P_{2}
Molar mass	440.507 g·mol^{−1}
Appearance	White solid
Melting point	41-44 °C

Hazards
- GHS labelling
Pictograms	(GHS07: Exclamation mark)
Signal word	Warning
Hazard statements	H315, H319, H335
Precautionary statements	P261, P264, P264+P265, P271, P280, P302+P352, P304+P340, P305+P351+P338, P319, P321, P332+P317, P337+P317, P362+P364, P403+P233, P405, P501
- Except where otherwise noted, data are given for materials in their standard state (at 25 °C [77 °F], 100 kPa). Infobox references

1,5-Bis(diphenylphosphino)pentane is an organophosphorus compound with the formula C_{29}H_{30}P_{2}. It can be prepared by reacting 1,5-dibromopentane with lithium diphenylphosphide, or diphenylphosphine in presence of caesium hydroxide. It reacts with copper(I) iodide to give a luminescent dinuclear complex [CuIPh_{2}P(CH_{2})_{5}PPh_{2}]_{2}.
