= Tetraphenylarsonium chloride =

Identifiers
CAS Number	507-28-8
3D model (JSmol)	Interactive image
ChemSpider	61486
ECHA InfoCard	100.007.337
EC Number	208-070-6
PubChem CID	68179
UNII	AG51MKF20J
CompTox Dashboard (EPA)	DTXSID20964938
- InChI: InChI=1S/C24H20As.ClH/c1-5-13-21(14-6-1)25(22-15-7-2-8-16-22,23-17-9-3-10-18-23)24-19-11-4-12-20-24;/h1-20H;1H/q+1;/p-1 Key: NRZGVGVFPHPXEO-UHFFFAOYSA-M
- SMILES: C1=CC=C(C=C1)[As+](C2=CC=CC=C2)(C3=CC=CC=C3)C4=CC=CC=C4.[Cl-]

Properties
Chemical formula	C_{24}H_{20}AsCl
Molar mass	418.80 g·mol^{−1}
Appearance	white solid

Hazards
- GHS labelling
Pictograms	(GHS06: Toxic) (GHS09: Environmental hazard)
Signal word	Danger
Hazard statements	H301, H331, H410
Precautionary statements	P261, P264, P270, P271, P273, P301+P310, P304+P340, P311, P321, P330, P391, P403+P233, P405, P501
- Except where otherwise noted, data are given for materials in their standard state (at 25 °C [77 °F], 100 kPa). Infobox references

Tetraphenylarsonium chloride is the organoarsenic compound with the formula (C_{6}H_{5})_{4}AsCl. This white solid is the chloride salt of the tetraphenylarsonium cation, which is tetrahedral. Typical of related quat salts, it is soluble in polar organic solvents. It often is used as a hydrate.

== Synthesis and reactions ==
It is prepared by neutralization of tetraphenylarsonium chloride hydrochloride, which is produced from triphenylarsine:

(C_{6}H_{5})_{3}As + Br_{2} → (C_{6}H_{5})_{3}AsBr_{2}
(C_{6}H_{5})_{3}AsBr_{2} + H_{2}O → (C_{6}H_{5})_{3}AsO + 2 HBr
(C_{6}H_{5})_{3}AsO + C_{6}H_{5}MgBr → (C_{6}H_{5})_{4}AsOMgBr
(C_{6}H_{5})_{4}AsOMgBr + 3 HCl → (C_{6}H_{5})_{4}AsCl^{.}HCl + MgBrCl
(C_{6}H_{5})_{4}AsCl^{.}HCl + NaOH → (C_{6}H_{5})_{4}AsCl + NaCl + H_{2}O

Like other quat salts, it is used to solubilize polyatomic anions in organic media. To this end, aqueous or methanolic solutions containing the anion of interest are treated with a solution of tetraphenylarsonium chloride, typically resulting in precipitation of the tetraphenylarsonium anion salt.

== Related compounds ==
- Tetraphenylphosphonium chloride
- Tetrabutylammonium chloride
- Tetraethylammonium chloride
