= Triphenylphosphine dichloride =

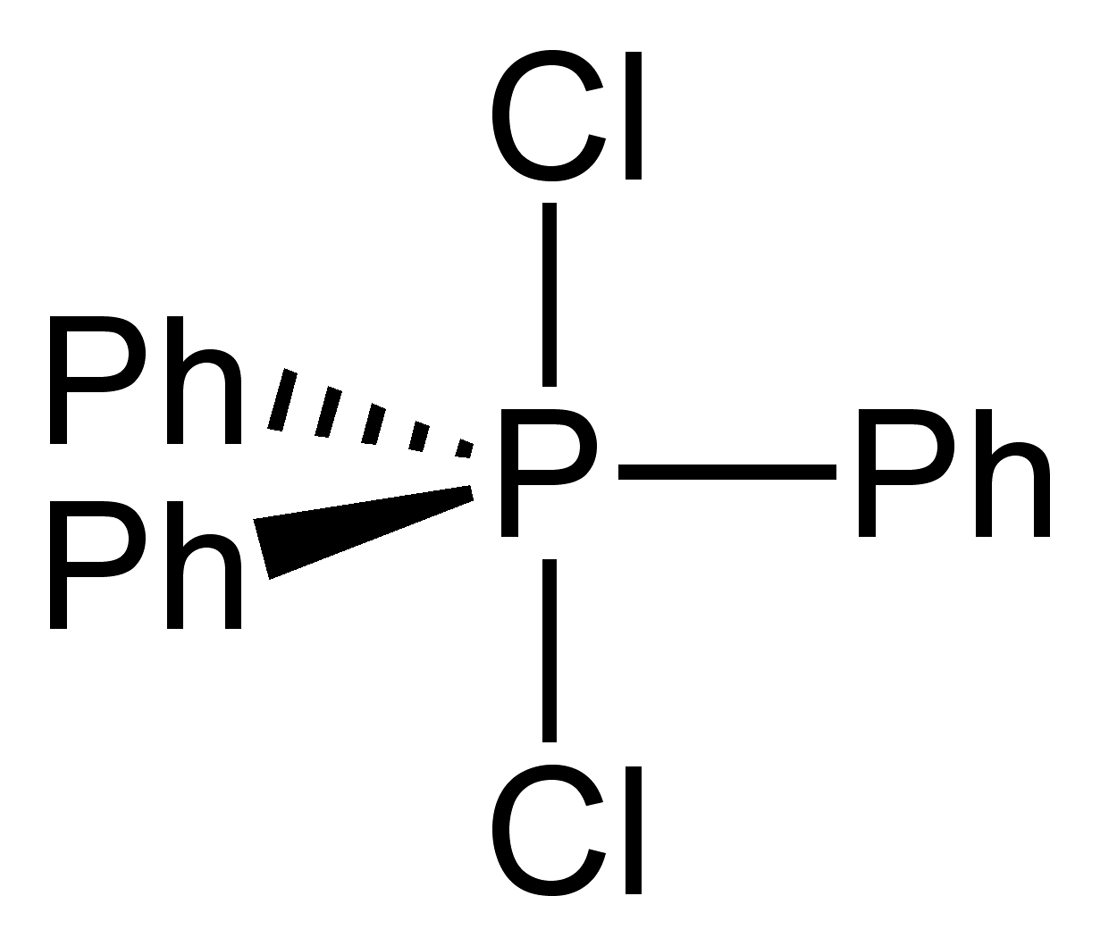
- Structural formula

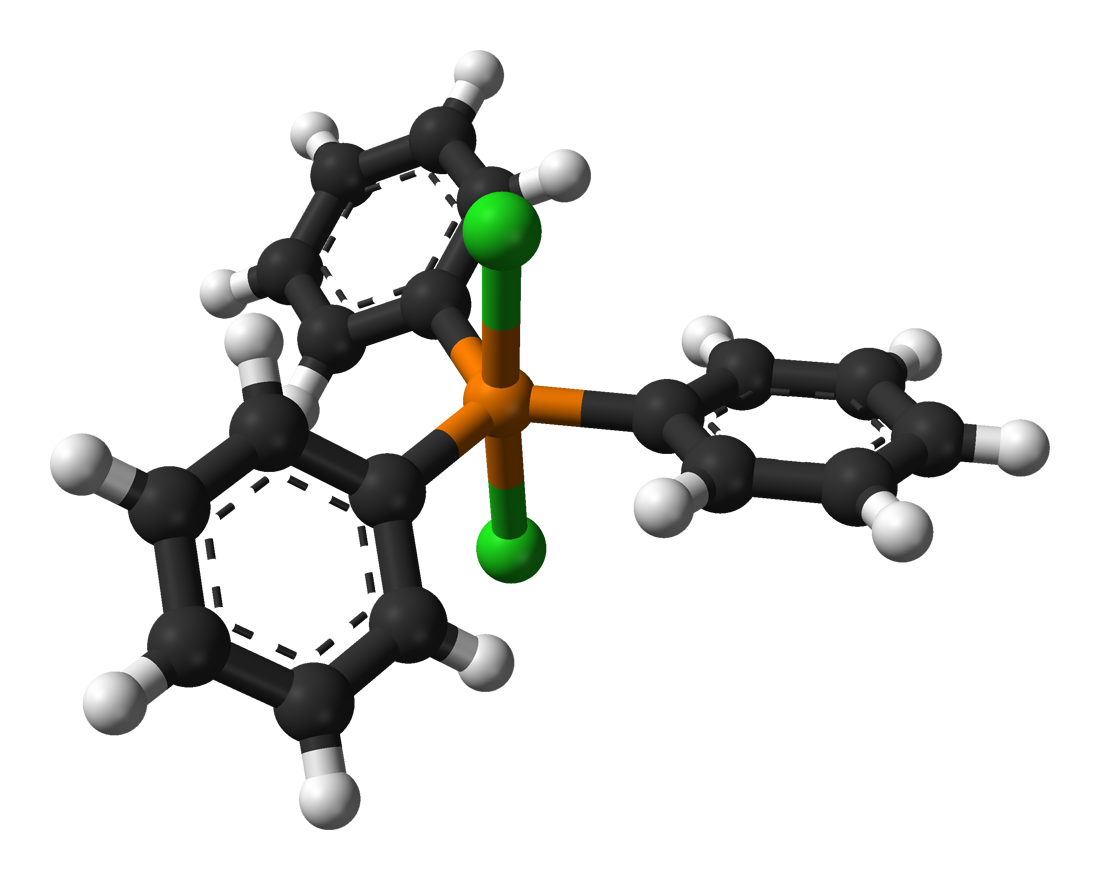
Ball-and-stick model
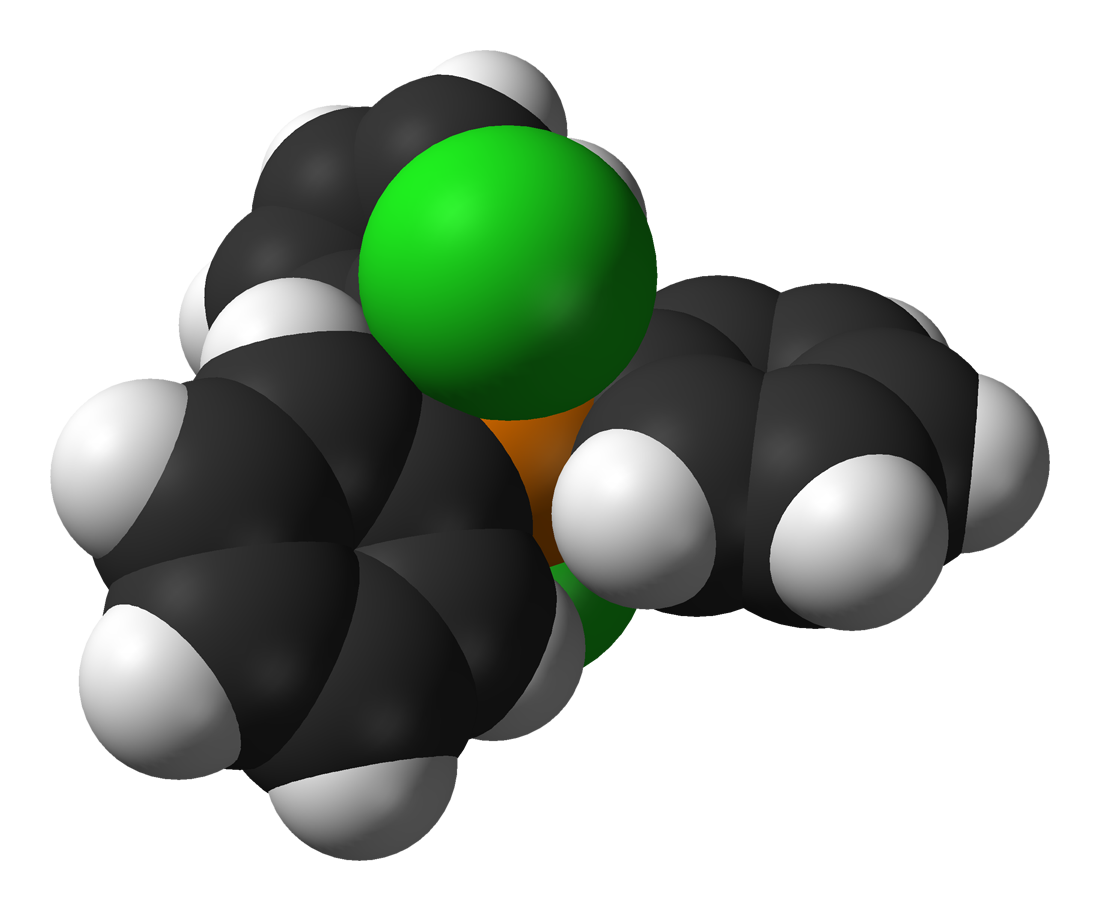
Space-filling model

Names
- Preferred IUPAC name Dichlorotri(phenyl)-λ^{5}-phosphane
- Other names Dichlorotriphenylphosphorane

Identifiers
CAS Number	2526-64-9
3D model (JSmol)	Interactive image
ChemSpider	228579
ECHA InfoCard	100.107.819
PubChem CID	260420
UNII	6CL2293LZ3
CompTox Dashboard (EPA)	DTXSID50293708
- InChI: InChI=1S/C18H15Cl2P/c19-21(20,16-10-4-1-5-11-16,17-12-6-2-7-13-17)18-14-8-3-9-15-18/h1-15H Key: ASWXNYNXAOQCCD-UHFFFAOYSA-N
- SMILES: ClP(Cl)(c1ccccc1)(c1ccccc1)c1ccccc1

Properties
Chemical formula	(C_{6}H_{5})_{3}PCl_{2}
Molar mass	333.19 g·mol^{−1}
Appearance	Colorless solid
Melting point	176 °C (349 °F; 449 K), 85-100 °C, 85 °C (decomposes)
Solubility in water	Reacts

Hazards
- Occupational safety and health (OHS/OSH)
Main hazards	May cause severe skin and eye injury and cancer. If the chemical is let to enter the drains, there is a risk of explosion.
- GHS labelling
Pictograms	(GHS02: Flammable) (GHS05: Corrosive) (GHS08: Health hazard)
Signal word	Danger
Hazard statements	H228, H314, H350
Precautionary statements	P210, P240, P241, P260, P264, P280, P301+P330+P331, P302+P361+P354, P304+P340, P305+P354+P338, P316, P321, P363, P370+P378, P405, P501

Related compounds
Related compounds	Phosphoranes; Triphenylphosphine; Phosphorus trichloride; Phosphorus pentachloride; Phosphorus halides; Tetraphenylphosphonium chloride
- Except where otherwise noted, data are given for materials in their standard state (at 25 °C [77 °F], 100 kPa). verify (what is ?) Infobox references

Triphenylphosphine dichloride is an organophosphorus compound with the chemical formula (C_{6}H_{5})_{3}PCl_{2}, often abbreviated as Ph_{3}PCl_{2}, where Ph is phenyl. It is a chlorinating agent widely used in organic chemistry. Applications include the conversion of alcohols and ethers to alkyl chlorides, the cleavage of epoxides to vicinal dichlorides and the chlorination of carboxylic acids to acyl chlorides.

== Structure ==
In polar solvents such as acetonitrile, Ph_{3}PCl_{2} adopts an ionic phosphonium salt structure, [Ph_{3}PCl]^{+}Cl^{−} (chlorotriphenylphosphonium chloride), whereas in non-polar solvents like diethyl ether it exists as a non-solvated trigonal bipyramidal molecule. Two [Ph_{3}PCl]^{+} species can also adopt an unusual dinuclear ionic structure—both interacting with a Cl^{−} via long Cl–Cl contacts.

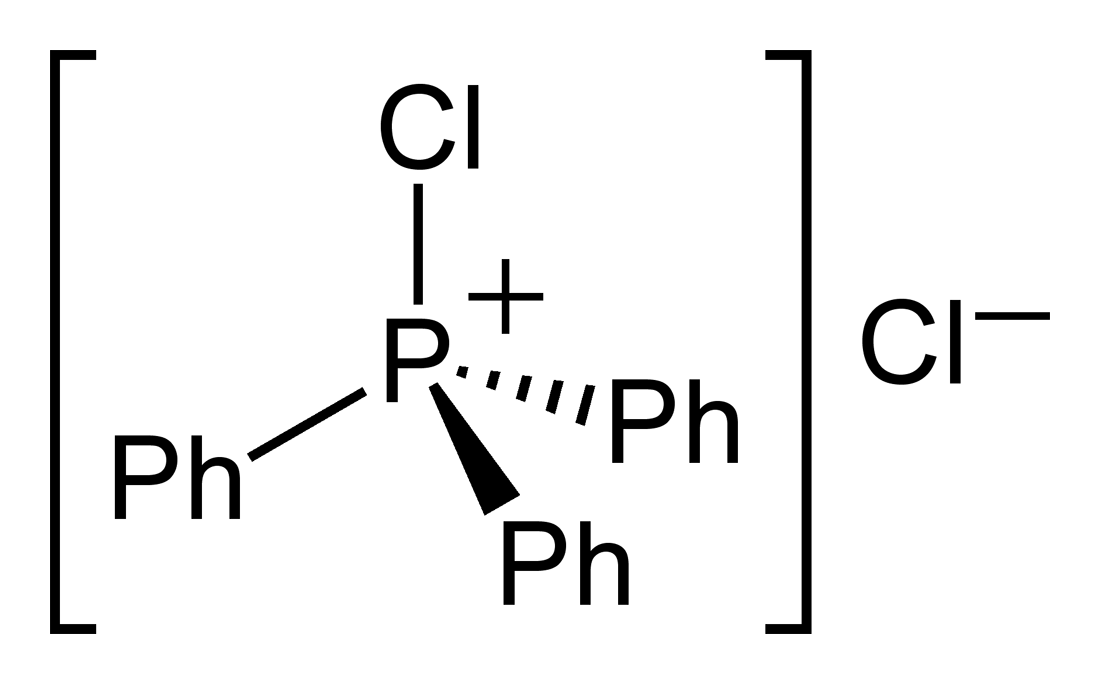

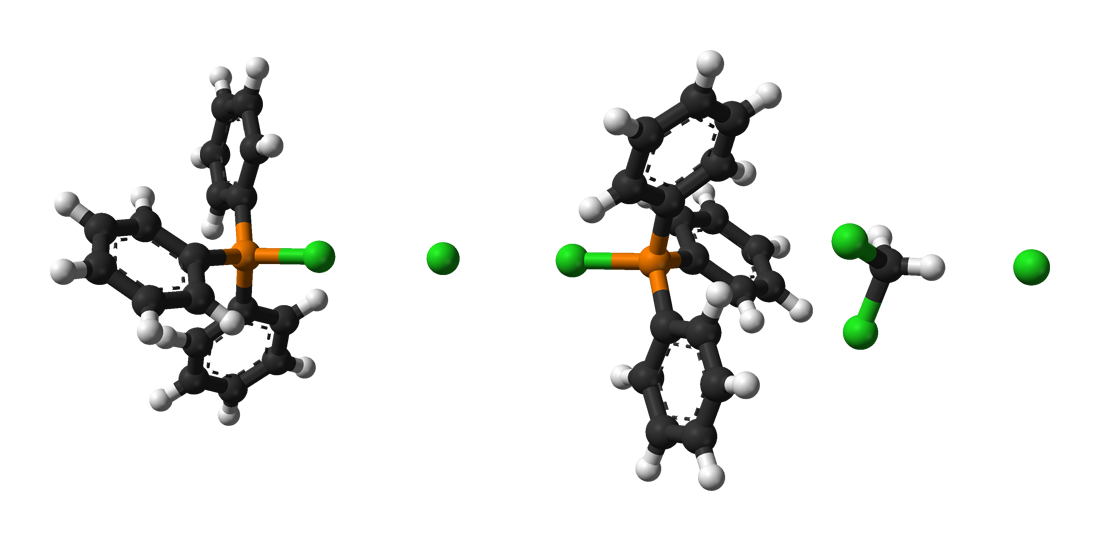

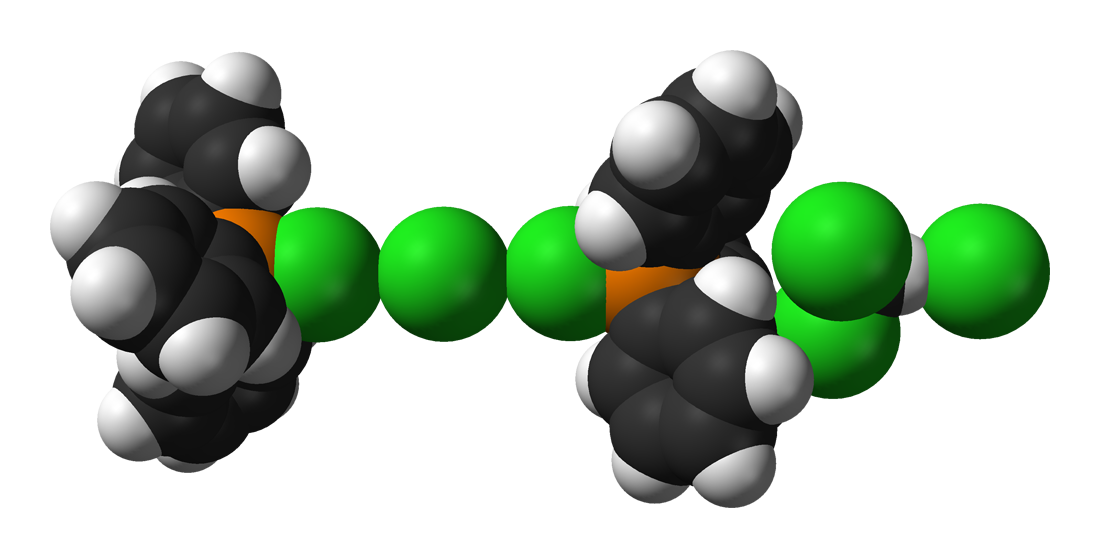

== Synthesis ==
Triphenylphosphine dichloride is usually prepared fresh by the addition of chlorine to triphenylphosphine.

Ph_{3}P + Cl_{2} → Ph_{3}PCl_{2}

Both reagents are typically used in solution to ensure the correct stoichiometry.

Ph_{3}PCl_{2} can also be obtained by the reaction of iodobenzene dichloride (PhICl_{2}) and triphenylphosphine.

Alternatively, Ph_{3}PCl_{2} can be obtained by chlorination of triphenylphosphine oxide with, for example, phosphorus trichloride, as in Grignard's original 1931 synthesis.
