= Tetraphenyldiphosphine =

Names
- Preferred IUPAC name Tetraphenyldiphosphane

Identifiers
CAS Number	1101-41-3
3D model (JSmol)	Interactive image
ChEMBL	ChEMBL68039
ChemSpider	63839
EC Number	214-155-9
PubChem CID	70673
CompTox Dashboard (EPA)	DTXSID60149141
- InChI: InChI=1S/C24H20P2/c1-5-13-21(14-6-1)25(22-15-7-2-8-16-22)26(23-17-9-3-10-18-23)24-19-11-4-12-20-24/h1-20H Key: DAPZRBJQPPDZGH-UHFFFAOYSA-N
- SMILES: C1=CC=C(C=C1)P(C2=CC=CC=C2)P(C3=CC=CC=C3)C4=CC=CC=C4

Properties
Chemical formula	C_{24}H_{20}P_{2}
Molar mass	370.372 g·mol^{−1}
Appearance	white solid
Density	1.292 g/cm^{3}
Melting point	125 °C (257 °F; 398 K)

Hazards
- GHS labelling
Pictograms	(GHS02: Flammable)
Signal word	Danger
Hazard statements	H250
Precautionary statements	P210, P222, P280, P302+P334, P370+P378, P422
- Except where otherwise noted, data are given for materials in their standard state (at 25 °C [77 °F], 100 kPa). Infobox references

Tetraphenyldiphosphine is the organophosphorus compound with the formula [PPh_{2}]_{2}, where Ph = phenyl (C_{6}H_{5}). It is a white, air-sensitive solid that dissolves in nonpolar solvents. It is a centrosymmetric molecule with a P-P bond of 2.2592 Å.

Tetraphenyldiphosphine is produced by reductive coupling of chlorodiphenylphosphine...

2 Ph_{2}PCl + 2 Na → Ph_{2}P-PPh_{2} + 2 NaCl

...or dehydrogenation of diphenylphosphine catalyzed by bis(triphenylphospine)nickel(II) bromide:

2 Ph_{2}PH → Ph_{2}P-PPh_{2} + H_{2}

The compound is used as a source of the Ph_{2}P^{−} group.

Ph_{2}P-PPh_{2} + 2 Na → + 2 NaPPh_{2}

Alternatively, the compound can homolyze along the weak P–P bond, in which case the resulting radicals add to alkenes and alkynes.

Oxidation with oxygen or sulfur gives the corresponding diphosphine dioxide or disulfide.
