= Chlorodiphenylphosphine =

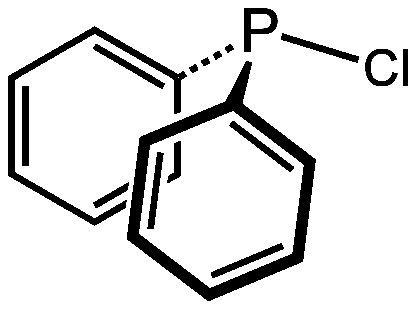

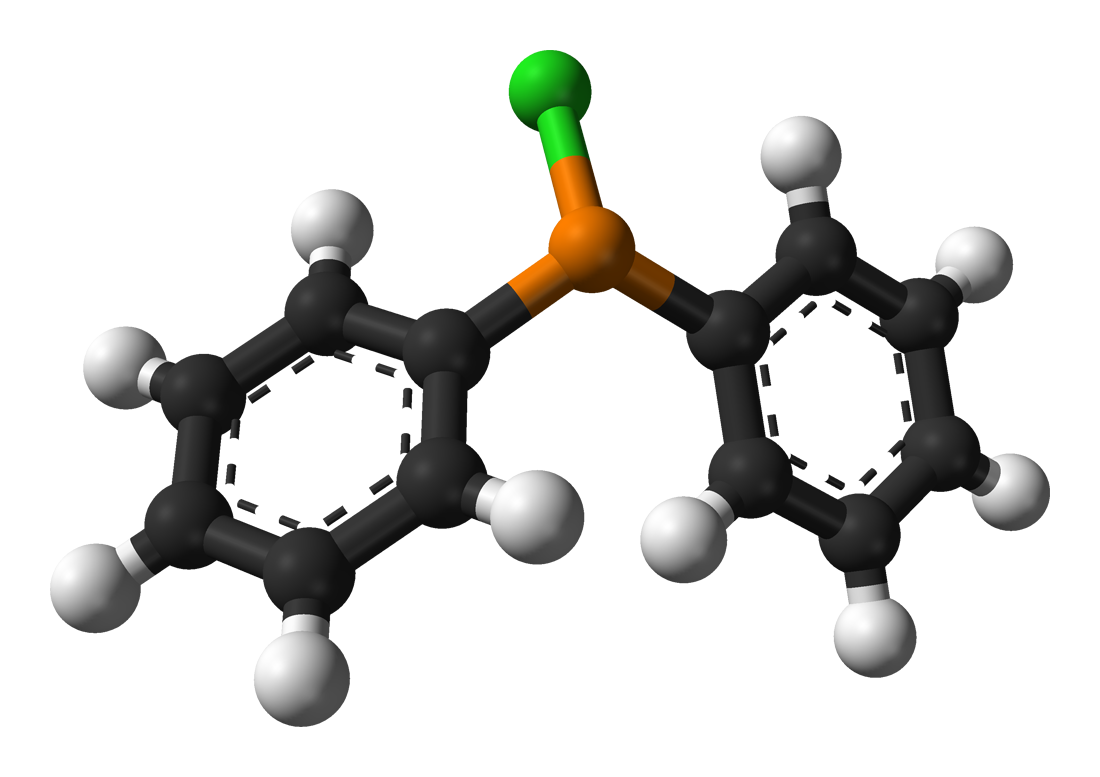

Names
- Preferred IUPAC name Diphenylphosphinous chloride
- Other names chlorodiphenylphosphine p-chlorodiphenylphosphine diphenyl phosphine chloride diphenylchlorophosphine

Identifiers
CAS Number	1079-66-9
3D model (JSmol)	Interactive image
ChemSpider	59567
ECHA InfoCard	100.012.813
EC Number	214-093-2
PubChem CID	66180
UNII	WO975PJK1Y
CompTox Dashboard (EPA)	DTXSID7038789
- InChI: InChI=1S/C12H10ClP/c13-14(11-7-3-1-4-8-11)12-9-5-2-6-10-12/h1-10H Key: XGRJZXREYAXTGV-UHFFFAOYSA-N; InChI=1/C12H10ClP/c13-14(11-7-3-1-4-8-11)12-9-5-2-6-10-12/h1-10H Key: XGRJZXREYAXTGV-UHFFFAOYAM
- SMILES: ClP(c1ccccc1)c2ccccc2

Properties
Chemical formula	C_{12}H_{10}ClP
Molar mass	220.63776 g mol^{−1}
Appearance	clear to light yellow liquid
Density	1.229 g cm^{−3}
Boiling point	320 ˚C
Solubility in water	Reacts
Solubility	Reacts with alcohols highly soluble in benzene, THF, and ethers

Hazards
- GHS labelling
Pictograms	(GHS05: Corrosive) (GHS07: Exclamation mark)
Signal word	Danger
Hazard statements	H290, H302, H314, H412
Precautionary statements	P234, P260, P264, P270, P273, P280, P301+P312, P301+P330+P331, P303+P361+P353, P304+P340, P305+P351+P338, P310, P321, P330, P363, P390, P404, P405, P501
- Except where otherwise noted, data are given for materials in their standard state (at 25 °C [77 °F], 100 kPa). verify (what is ?) Infobox references

Chlorodiphenylphosphine is an organophosphorus compound with the formula (C_{6}H_{5})_{2}PCl, abbreviated Ph_{2}PCl. It is a colourless oily liquid with a pungent odor that is often described as being garlic-like and detectable even in the ppb range. It is useful reagent for introducing the Ph_{2}P group into molecules, which includes many ligands. Like other halophosphines, Ph_{2}PCl is reactive with many nucleophiles such as water and easily oxidized even by air.

== Synthesis and reactions ==
Chlorodiphenylphosphine is produced on a commercial scale from benzene and phosphorus trichloride (PCl_{3}). Benzene reacts with phosphorus trichloride at extreme temperatures around 600 °C to give dichlorophenylphosphine (PhPCl_{2}) and HCl. Redistribution of PhPCl_{2} in the gas phase at high temperatures results in chlorodiphenylphosphine.

2 PhPCl_{2} → Ph_{2}PCl + PCl_{3}

Alternatively such compounds are prepared by redistribution reactions starting with triphenylphosphine and phosphorus trichloride.

PCl_{3} + 2 PPh_{3} → 3 Ph_{2}PCl

Chlorodiphenylphosphine hydrolyzes to give diphenylphosphine oxide. Reduction with sodium affords tetraphenyldiphosphine:

2 Ph_{2}PCl + 2 Na → [Ph_{2}P]_{2} + 2 NaCl

With ammonia and elemental sulfur, it converts to the thiophosphorylamide:

Ph_{2}PCl + 2 NH_{3} + S → Ph_{2}P(S)NH_{2} + NH_{4}Cl

== Uses ==
Chlorodiphenylphosphine, along with other chlorophosphines, is used in the synthesis of various phosphines. A typical route uses Grignard reagents:

Ph_{2}PCl + MgRX → Ph_{2}PR + MgClX

The phosphines produced from reactions with Ph_{2}PCl are further developed and used as pesticides (such as EPN), stabilizers for plastics (Sandostab P-EPQ), various halogen compound catalysts, flame retardants (cyclic phosphinocarboxylic anhydride), as well as UV-hardening paint systems (used in dental materials) making Ph_{2}PCl an important intermediate in the industrial world.

=== Precursor to diphenylphosphido derivatives ===
Chlorodiphenylphosphine is used in the synthesis of sodium diphenylphosphide via its reaction with sodium metal in refluxing dioxane.

Ph_{2}PCl + 2 Na → Ph_{2}PNa + NaCl

Diphenylphosphine can be synthesized in the reaction of Ph_{2}PCl and LiAlH_{4}, the latter usually used in excess.

4 Ph_{2}PCl + LiAlH_{4} → 4 Ph_{2}PH + LiCl + AlCl_{3}

Both Ph_{2}PNa and Ph_{2}PH are also used in the synthesis of organophosphine ligands.

== Characterization ==
The quality of chlorodiphenylphosphine is often checked by 31P NMR spectroscopy.

Compound	^{31}P chemical shift (ppm vs 85% H_{3}PO_{4})
PPh_{3}	-6
PPh_{2}Cl	81.5
PPhCl_{2}	165
PCl_{3}	218
