= Tetraphenylphosphonium chloride =

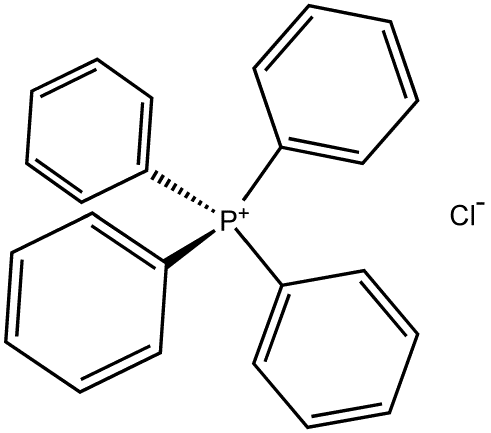

Names
- Preferred IUPAC name Tetraphenylphosphanium chloride

Identifiers
CAS Number	2001-45-8
3D model (JSmol)	Interactive image
ChEMBL	ChEMBL223885
ChemSpider	144578
ECHA InfoCard	100.016.265
EC Number	217-890-3
PubChem CID	164911
CompTox Dashboard (EPA)	DTXSID00897533
- InChI: InChI=1S/C24H20P.ClH/c1-5-13-21(14-6-1)25(22-15-7-2-8-16-22,23-17-9-3-10-18-23)24-19-11-4-12-20-24;/h1-20H;1H/q+1;/p-1 Key: WAGFXJQAIZNSEQ-UHFFFAOYSA-M; InChI=1S/C24H20P.ClH/c1-5-13-21(14-6-1)25(22-15-7-2-8-16-22,23-17-9-3-10-18-23)24-19-11-4-12-20-24;/h1-20H;1H/q+1;/p-1 Key: WAGFXJQAIZNSEQ-REWHXWOFAO; Key: WAGFXJQAIZNSEQ-UHFFFAOYSA-M
- SMILES: [Cl-].c1c(cccc1)[P+](c2ccccc2)(c3ccccc3)c4ccccc4

Properties
Chemical formula	[P(C_{6}H_{5})_{4}]Cl
Molar mass	374.85 g·mol^{−1}
Appearance	colourless solid
Density	1.27 g dm^{−3}
Melting point	272 to 274 °C (522 to 525 °F; 545 to 547 K)

Hazards
- GHS labelling
Pictograms	(GHS07: Exclamation mark)
Signal word	Warning
Hazard statements	H315, H319, H335
Precautionary statements	P261, P264, P271, P280, P302+P352, P304+P340, P305+P351+P338, P312, P321, P332+P313, P337+P313, P362, P403+P233, P405, P501
- Except where otherwise noted, data are given for materials in their standard state (at 25 °C [77 °F], 100 kPa). verify (what is ?) Infobox references

Tetraphenylphosphonium chloride is the chemical compound with the formula [(C_{6}H_{5})_{4}P]Cl, abbreviated Ph_{4}PCl or PPh_{4}Cl or [PPh_{4}]Cl, where Ph stands for phenyl. Tetraphenylphosphonium and especially tetraphenylarsonium salts were formerly of interest in gravimetric analysis of perchlorate and related oxyanions. This colourless salt is used to generate lipophilic salts from inorganic and organometallic anions. Thus, [Ph_{4}P]^{+} is useful as a phase-transfer catalyst, again because it allows inorganic anions to dissolve in organic solvents.

== Structure and basic properties ==
The structure of this salt is [PPh_{4}]^{+}Cl^{−}. It consists of tetraphenylphosphonium cations [PPh_{4}]^{+} and chloride anions Cl^{−}. The [PPh_{4}]^{+} cation is tetrahedral around the phosphorus atom.

PPh_{4}Cl crystallises as the anhydrous salt, which is the normal item of commerce, as well as a monohydrate and a dihydrate.

In X-ray crystallography, PPh^{+}_{4} salts are of interest as they often crystallise easily. The rigidity of the phenyl groups facilitates packing and elevates the melting point relative to alkyl-based quaternary ammonium salts. Also, since these salts are soluble in organic media, a wide range of solvents can be employed for their crystallisation.

constituent ions in the solid	space-filling model of part of the crystal structure	ball-and-stick model of part of the crystal structure

== Preparation ==
[PPh_{4}]Cl and many analogous compounds can be prepared by the reaction of chlorobenzene with triphenylphosphine catalysed by nickel salts:

PhCl + PPh_{3} → [Ph_{4}P]Cl

The compound was originally prepared as the corresponding bromide salt (CAS No. 2751-90-8), which in turn was synthesized by passing dry oxygen through the reaction of phenylmagnesium bromide and triphenylphosphine. The synthesis probably proceeds via the reaction of the Grignard reagent with triphenylphosphine oxide.

PhMgBr + Ph_{3}PO → [Ph_{4}P]OMgBr
[Ph_{4}P]OMgBr + HBr → [Ph_{4}P]Br + "Mg(OH)Br"

== Use in synthesis ==
Tetraphenylphosphonium salts of inorganic or organometallic anions are often sought because they are easily crystallized. They also tend to be soluble in polar organic solvents such as acetonitrile and dimethylformamide. Examples include the tetraphenylphosphonium perrhenate ([PPh_{4}]^{+}[ReO_{4}]^{−}) and various thiomolybdates. Complexes of maleonitriledithiolate are also isolated as their [PPh_{4}]^{+} salts.
