= Triphenylphosphine sulfide =

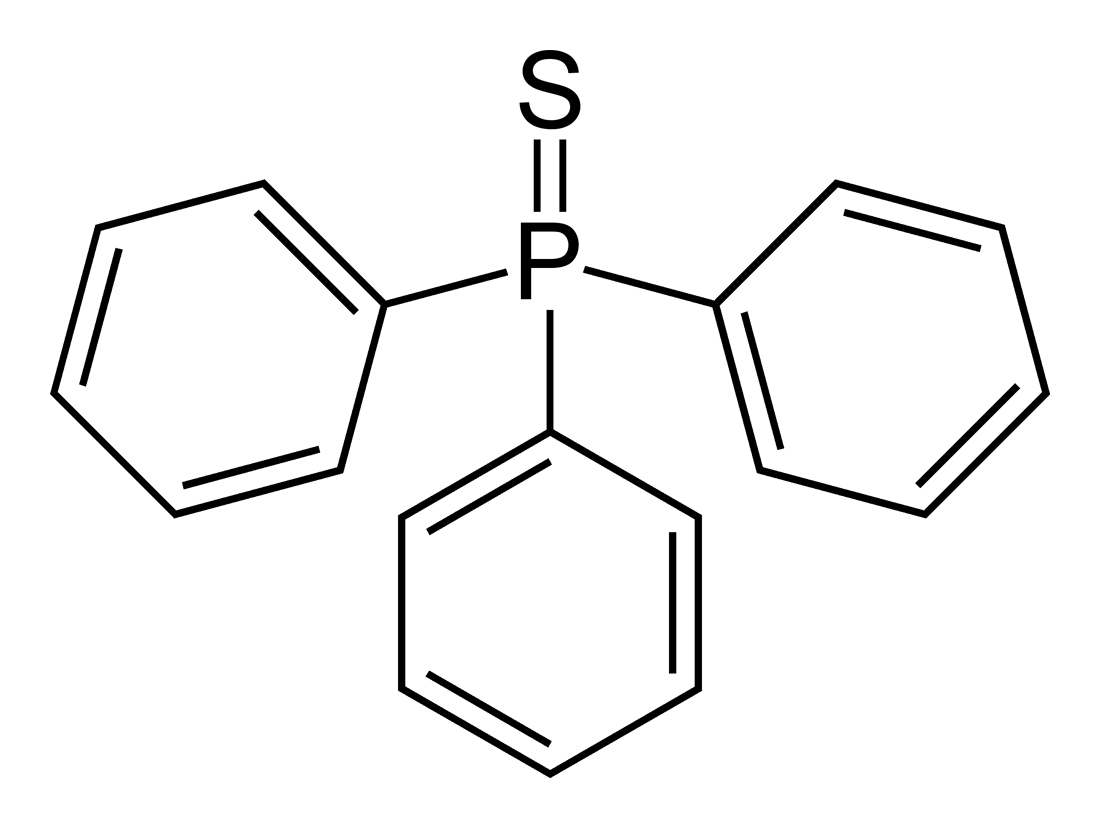

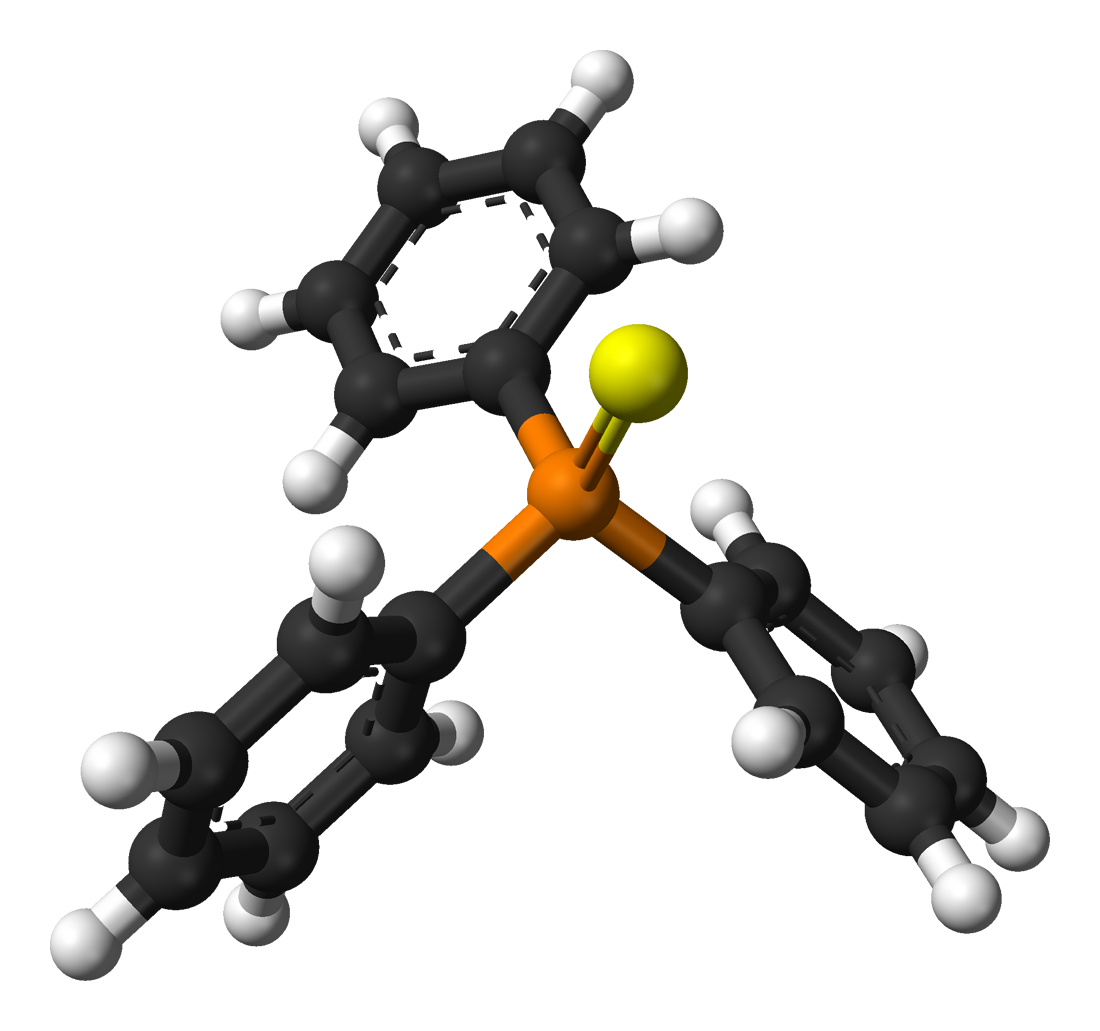

Names
- Preferred IUPAC name Triphenyl-λ^{5}-phosphanethione
- Other names: Triphenylphosphane sulfide; Triphenylphosphine sulfide; Triphenylthioxophosphorane

Identifiers
CAS Number	3878-45-3
3D model (JSmol)	Interactive image
ChemSpider	18610
ECHA InfoCard	100.021.280
PubChem CID	19758
UNII	Q68E5JRQ8V
CompTox Dashboard (EPA)	DTXSID10192046
- InChI: InChI=1S/C18H15PS/c20-19(16-10-4-1-5-11-16,17-12-6-2-7-13-17)18-14-8-3-9-15-18/h1-15H Key: VYNGFCUGSYEOOZ-UHFFFAOYSA-N; InChI=1/C18H15PS/c20-19(16-10-4-1-5-11-16,17-12-6-2-7-13-17)18-14-8-3-9-15-18/h1-15H Key: VYNGFCUGSYEOOZ-UHFFFAOYAH
- SMILES: c1ccc(cc1)P(=S)(c2ccccc2)c3ccccc3

Properties
Chemical formula	(C_{6}H_{5})_{3}PS
Molar mass	294.350461 g/mol
Appearance	Colourless solid
Melting point	161 to 163 °C (322 to 325 °F; 434 to 436 K)
Solubility	soluble in dichloromethane, ethanol

Related compounds
Related compounds	Triphenylphosphine oxide
- Except where otherwise noted, data are given for materials in their standard state (at 25 °C [77 °F], 100 kPa). verify (what is ?) Infobox references

Triphenylphosphine sulfide (IUPAC name: triphenyl-λ^{5}-phosphanethione) is the organophosphorus compound with the formula (C_{6}H_{5})_{3}PS, usually written Ph_{3}PS (where Ph = phenyl). It is a colourless solid, which is soluble in a variety of organic solvents.

Structurally, the molecule resembles the corresponding oxide, with idealized C_{3} point group symmetry. It is weakly nucleophilic at the sulfur atom.

== Applications ==
=== Organic synthesis ===
Triphenylphosphine sulfide is useful for the conversion of epoxides to the corresponding episulfides:

Ph_{2}C_{2}H_{2}O + Ph_{3}PS → Ph_{2}C_{2}H_{2}S + Ph_{3}PO

It also reacts with ketenes to form thioketenes:

Ph_{2}CCO + Ph_{3}PS → Ph_{2}CCS + Ph_{3}PO

=== Analytical chemistry ===
In analytical chemistry, triphenylphosphine is used for the analysis of certain kinds of sulfur compounds. Elemental sulfur (S_{8}), as occurs in some oils, and labile organosulfur compounds, such as organic trisulfides, react with triphenylphosphine to give Ph_{3}PS, which can be detected by gas chromatography.
