= Decyl(triphenyl)phosphonium =

Chemical compound

Names
- Preferred IUPAC name Dodecyltri(phenyl)phosphanium
- Other names Dodecyltriphenylphosphonium, C12TPP(+), DTPP

Identifiers
CAS Number	ion: 17895-72-6; bromide: 15510-55-1
3D model (JSmol)	ion: Interactive image
ChEBI	ion: CHEBI:82636
ChEMBL	ion: ChEMBL3306671; bromide: ChEMBL3229257
ChemSpider	ion: 76637
PubChem CID	ion: 84956
UNII	bromide: 2OQV5UAF87
CompTox Dashboard (EPA)	ion: DTXSID70904622
- InChI: InChI=1S/C30H40P/c1-2-3-4-5-6-7-8-9-10-20-27-31(28-21-14-11-15-22-28,29-23-16-12-17-24-29)30-25-18-13-19-26-30/h11-19,21-26H,2-10,20,27H2,1H3/q+1 Key: VZXRCMCRCZBKEZ-UHFFFAOYSA-N
- SMILES: ion: CCCCCCCCCCCC[P+](C1=CC=CC=C1)(C2=CC=CC=C2)C3=CC=CC=C3

Properties
Chemical formula	C_{30}H_{40}P^{+}
Molar mass	431.623 g·mol^{−1}
- Except where otherwise noted, data are given for materials in their standard state (at 25 °C [77 °F], 100 kPa). Infobox references

Decyl(triphenyl)phosphonium (DTPP) is the organophosphorus cation with the formula C_{10}H_{21}P(C_{6}H_{5})_{3}^{+}. It is a lipophilic quaternary phosphonium cation. It forms the basis for many mitochondrial-targeted drugs, including MitoQ, MitoE, and SkQ. It binds to the mitochondrial matrix by insertion into the inner membrane. DTPP itself can cause mitochondrial swelling in kidney tissue, an action possibly related to increased membrane permeability.
