= Triphenylphosphine oxide =

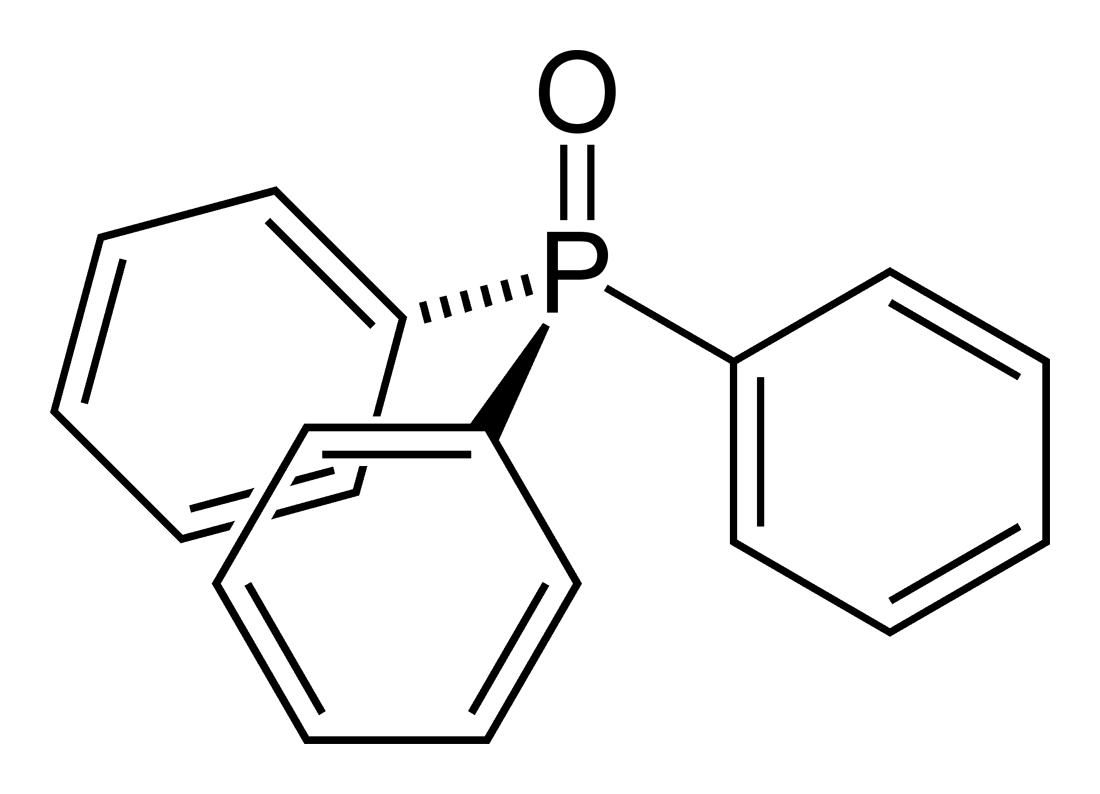
- Triphenylphosphine oxide

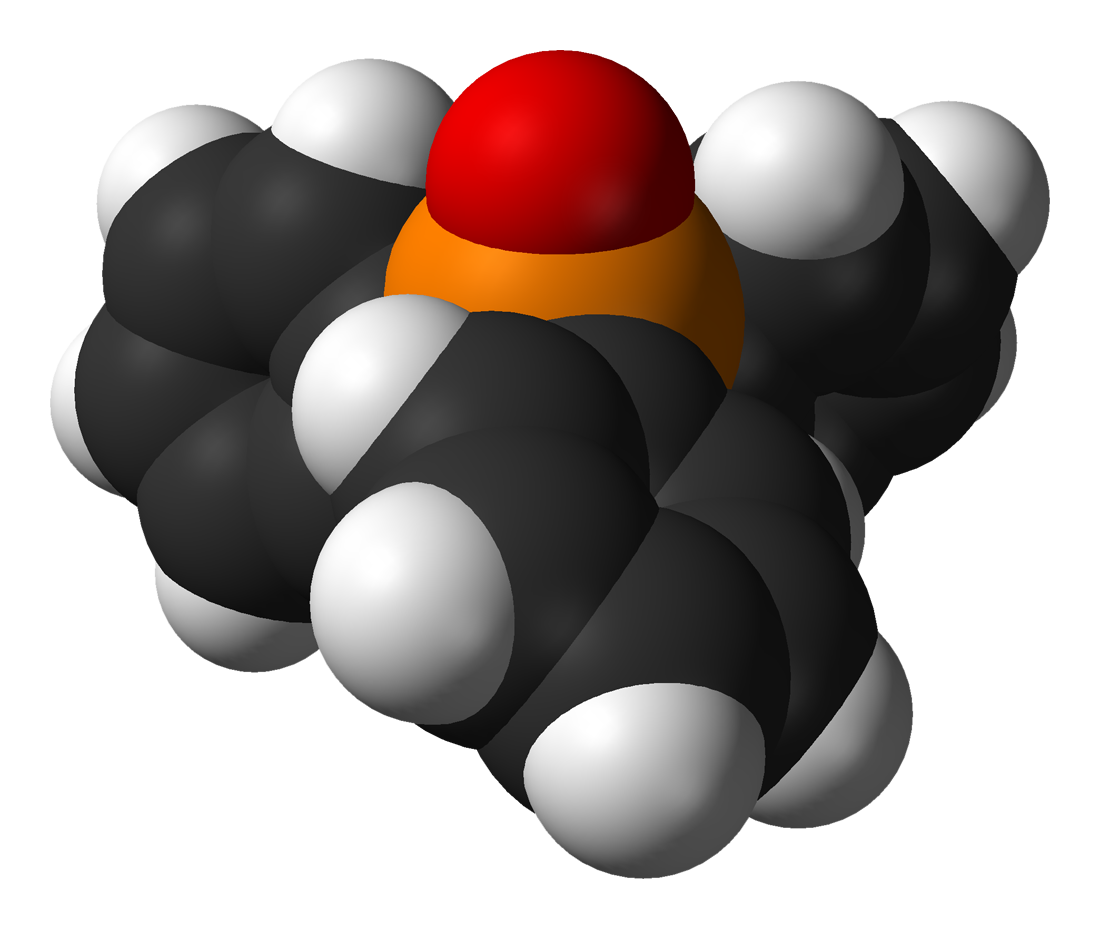
- Triphenylphosphine oxide

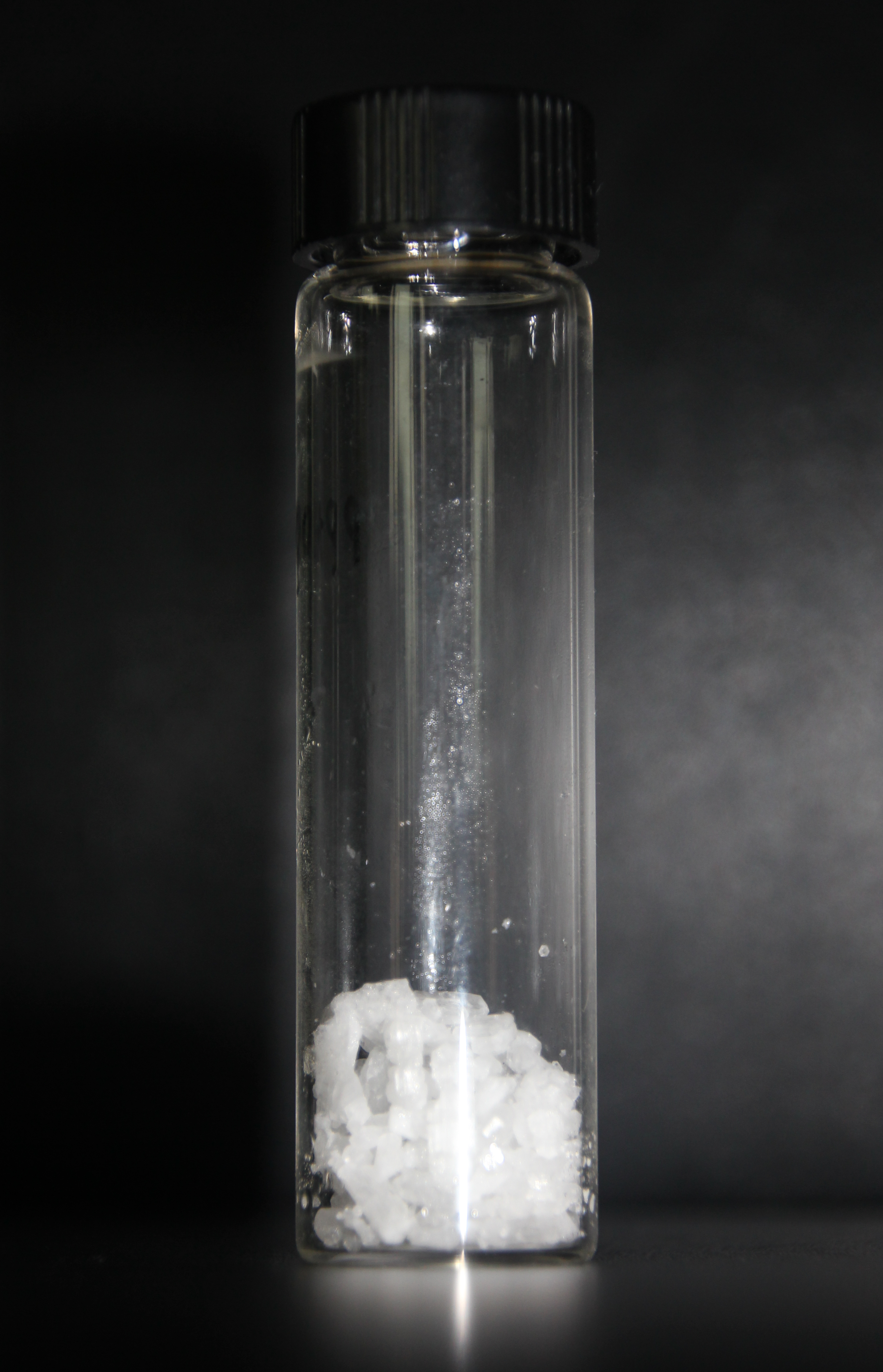

Names
- Preferred IUPAC name Triphenyl-λ^{5}-phosphanone
- Other names Triphenylphosphine oxide

Identifiers
CAS Number	791-28-6
3D model (JSmol)	Interactive image
Beilstein Reference	745854
ChEBI	CHEBI:36601
ChEMBL	ChEMBL482091
ChemSpider	12549
ECHA InfoCard	100.011.217
EC Number	212-338-8
Gmelin Reference	6758
PubChem CID	13097
RTECS number	SZ1676000
UNII	Z69161FKI3
CompTox Dashboard (EPA)	DTXSID2022121
- InChI: InChI=1S/C18H15OP/c19-20(16-10-4-1-5-11-16,17-12-6-2-7-13-17)18-14-8-3-9-15-18/h1-15H Key: FIQMHBFVRAXMOP-UHFFFAOYSA-N; InChI=1/C18H15OP/c19-20(16-10-4-1-5-11-16,17-12-6-2-7-13-17)18-14-8-3-9-15-18/h1-15H Key: FIQMHBFVRAXMOP-UHFFFAOYAB
- SMILES: O=P(c1ccccc1)(c2ccccc2)c3ccccc3

Properties
Chemical formula	OP(C_{6}H_{5})_{3}
Molar mass	278.291 g·mol^{−1}
Appearance	white crystals
Density	1.212 g/cm^{3}
Melting point	154 to 158 °C (309 to 316 °F; 427 to 431 K)
Boiling point	360 °C (680 °F; 633 K)
Solubility in water	low
Solubility in other solvents	polar organic solvents

Structure
Molecular shape	tetrahedral

Hazards
- Occupational safety and health (OHS/OSH)
Main hazards	Harmful if swallowed. Harmful to aquatic life with long lasting effects.
- GHS labelling
Pictograms	(GHS07: Exclamation mark)
Signal word	Warning
Hazard statements	H302, H412
Precautionary statements	P261, P264, P270, P271, P273, P280, P301+P312, P302+P352, P304+P340, P305+P351+P338, P312, P330, P332+P313, P337+P313, P362, P403+P233, P405

Related compounds
Related compounds	Triphenylphosphine sulfide; Triphenylphosphine; Phosphoryl chloride; Phosphorus pentachloride
- Except where otherwise noted, data are given for materials in their standard state (at 25 °C [77 °F], 100 kPa). verify (what is ?) Infobox references

Triphenylphosphine oxide (often abbreviated TPPO) is the organophosphorus compound with the formula O=P(C_{6}H_{5})_{3}, also written as Ph_{3}PO or PPh_{3}O (Ph = C_{6}H_{5}). It is one of the more common phosphine oxides. This colourless crystalline compound is a common but potentially useful waste product in reactions involving triphenylphosphine. It is a popular reagent to induce the crystallizing of chemical compounds.

== Structure and properties ==
Ph_{3}PO is structurally related to POCl_{3}. As established by X-ray crystallography, the geometry around P is tetrahedral, and the P-O distance is 1.48 Å. Other modifications of Ph_{3}PO have been found: For example, a monoclinic form crystallizes in the space group P2_{1}/c with Z = 4 and a = 15.066(1) Å, b = 9.037(2) Å, c = 11.296(3) Å, and β = 98.47(1)°.The orthorhombic modification crystallizes in the space group Pbca with Z = 4 and a = 29.089(3) Å, b = 9.1347(9), c = 11.261(1) Å.

The oxygen center is relatively basic. The rigidity of the backbone and the basicity of the oxygen center make this species a popular agent to crystallize otherwise difficult to crystallize molecules. This trick is applicable to molecules that have acidic hydrogen atoms, e.g. phenols.

== As a byproduct of organic synthesis ==
Ph_{3}PO is a byproduct of many useful reactions in organic synthesis including the Wittig, Staudinger, and Mitsunobu reactions. It is also formed when PPh_{3}Cl_{2} is employed to convert alcohols into alkyl chlorides:

Ph_{3}PCl_{2} + ROH → Ph_{3}PO + HCl + RCl

Triphenylphosphine can be regenerated from its oxide by treatment with a variety of deoxygenation agents, such as phosgene or trichlorosilane/triethylamine:

Ph_{3}PO + SiHCl_{3} → PPh_{3} + 1/n (OSiCl_{2})_{n} + HCl

Triphenylphosphine oxide can be difficult to remove from reaction mixtures by means of chromatography. It is poorly soluble in hexane and cold diethyl ether. Trituration or chromatography of crude products with these solvents often leads to a good separation of triphenylphosphine oxide. Its removal is facilitated by conversion to its Mg(II) complex, which is poorly soluble in toluene or dichloromethane and can be filtered off. An alternative filtration method where ZnCl_{2}(TPPO)_{2} is formed upon addition of ZnCl_{2} may be used with more polar solvents such as ethanol, ethyl acetate and tetrahydrofuran.

== Coordination chemistry ==
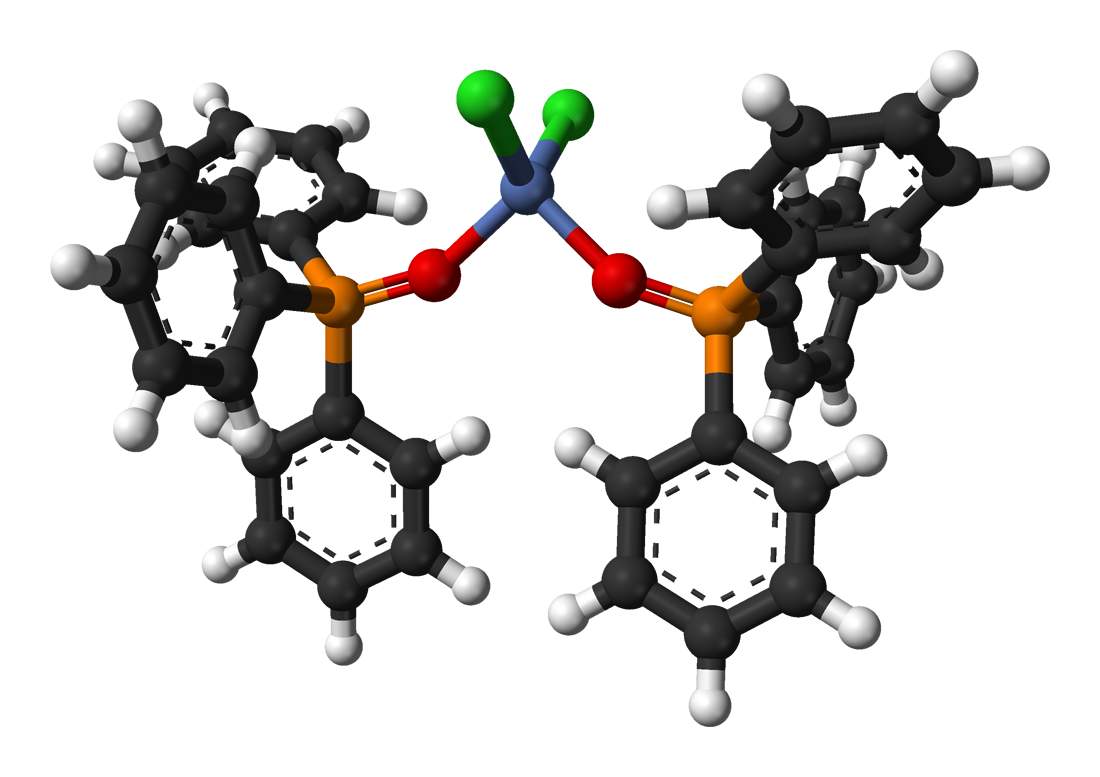
NiCl_{2}(OPPh_{3})_{2}

Ph_{3}PO forms a variety of complexes. A representative complex is the tetrahedral species NiCl_{2}(OPPh_{3})_{2}.

Ph_{3}PO is a common impurity in PPh_{3}. The oxidation of PPh_{3} by oxygen, including air, is catalysed by many metal ions:

2 PPh_{3} + O_{2} → 2 Ph_{3}PO
