= Diphenylphosphine =

- Ball-and-stick model

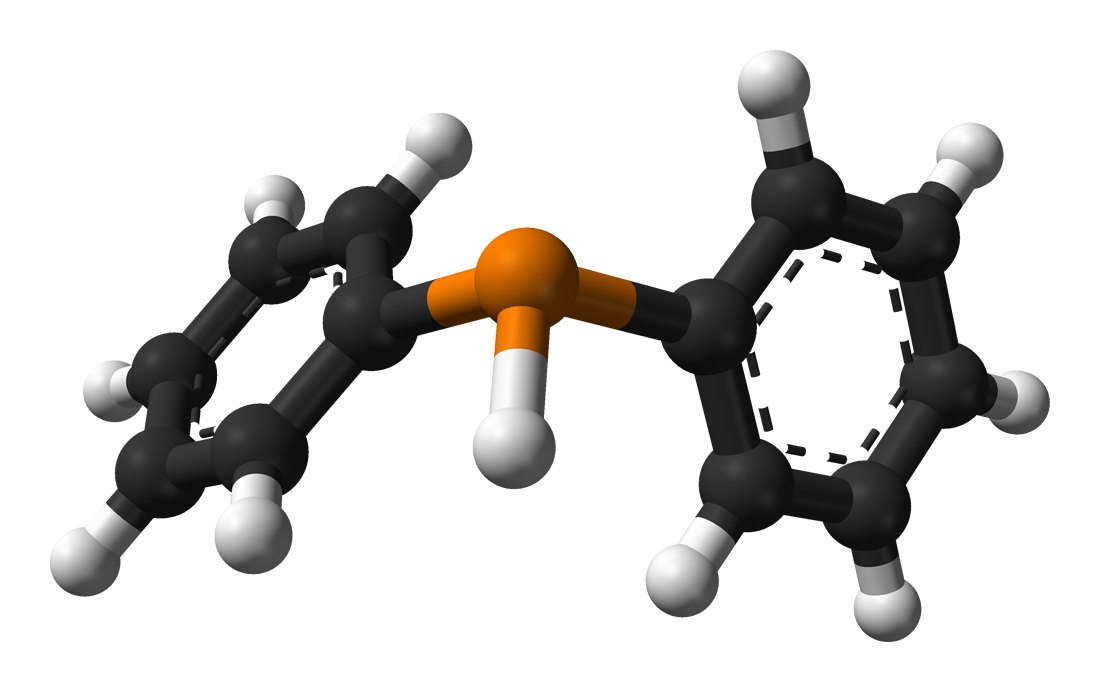
- Ball-and-stick model

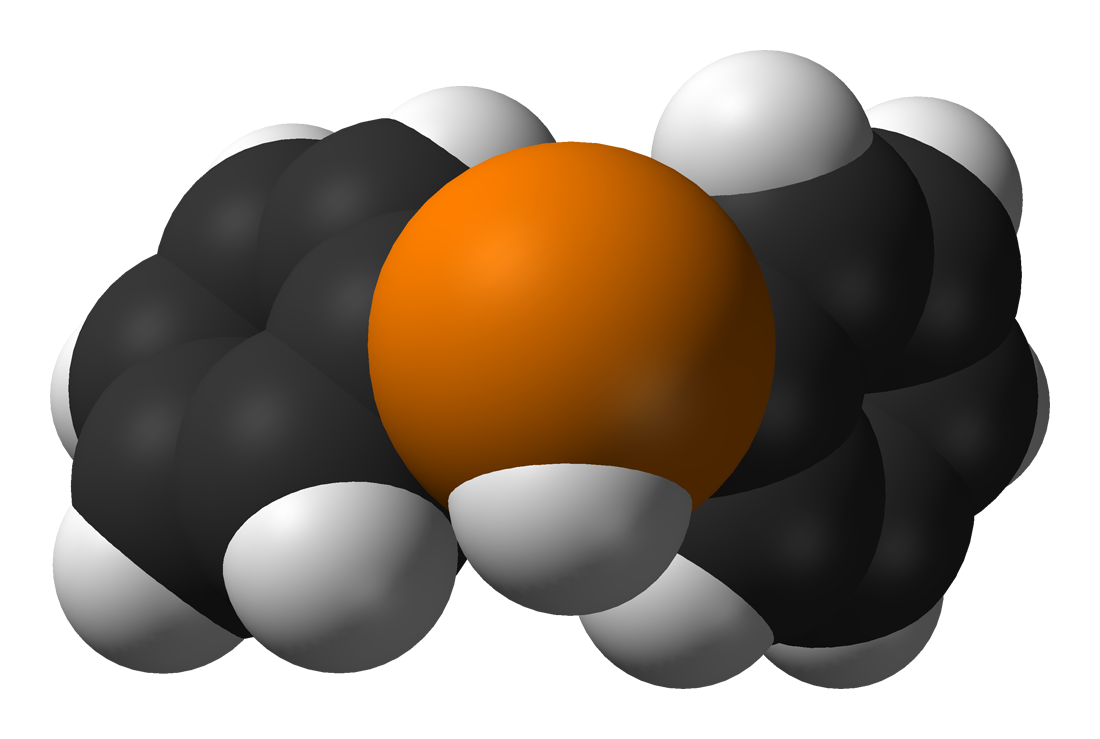

Names
- Preferred IUPAC name Diphenylphosphane

Identifiers
CAS Number	829-85-6
3D model (JSmol)	Interactive image
ChemSpider	63209
ECHA InfoCard	100.011.447
EC Number	212-591-4
PubChem CID	70017
UNII	F9B5T7O7ZY
CompTox Dashboard (EPA)	DTXSID50232076
- InChI: InChI=1S/C12H11P/c1-3-7-11(8-4-1)13-12-9-5-2-6-10-12/h1-10,13H Key: GPAYUJZHTULNBE-UHFFFAOYSA-N; InChI=1/C12H11P/c1-3-7-11(8-4-1)13-12-9-5-2-6-10-12/h1-10,13H Key: GPAYUJZHTULNBE-UHFFFAOYAN
- SMILES: c2c(Pc1ccccc1)cccc2

Properties
Chemical formula	C_{12}H_{11}P
Molar mass	186.19 g/mol
Appearance	colorless liquid
Density	1.07 g/cm^{3}, liquid
Boiling point	280 °C (536 °F; 553 K)
Solubility in water	Insoluble

Hazards
- GHS labelling
Pictograms	(GHS02: Flammable) (GHS07: Exclamation mark)
Signal word	Danger
Hazard statements	H250, H315, H319, H335
Precautionary statements	P210, P222, P261, P264, P271, P280, P302+P334, P302+P352, P304+P340, P305+P351+P338, P312, P321, P332+P313, P337+P313, P362, P370+P378, P403+P233, P405, P422, P501
Safety data sheet (SDS)	External MSDS
- Except where otherwise noted, data are given for materials in their standard state (at 25 °C [77 °F], 100 kPa). verify (what is ?) Infobox references

Diphenylphosphine, also known as diphenylphosphane, is an organophosphorus compound with the formula (C_{6}H_{5})_{2}PH. This foul-smelling, colorless liquid is easily oxidized in air. It is a precursor to organophosphorus ligands for use as catalysts.

== Synthesis ==
Diphenylphosphine can be prepared from triphenylphosphine by reduction to lithium diphenylphosphide, which can be protonated to give the title compound:

PPh_{3} + 2 Li → LiPPh_{2} + LiPh
LiPPh_{2} + H_{2}O → Ph_{2}PH + LiOH

== Uses and reactions ==
In the laboratory, diphenylphosphine is a common intermediate. It can be deprotonated to give diphenylphosphide derivatives:

Ph_{2}PH + ^{n}BuLi → Ph_{2}PLi + ^{n}BuH

The preparation of phosphine ligands, Wittig-Horner reagents, and phosphonium salts are commonly accomplished by alkylating diphenylphosphine. The hydrogen atom connected to phosphorus undergoes Michael-like addition to activated alkenes, providing products with which to produce phosphine ligands such as 1,2-bis(diphenylphosphino)ethane (Ph_{2}PCH_{2}CH_{2}PPh_{2}) and BINAP via their respective bistriflate derivatives. Both the (R)- and (S)-enantiomers, as well as the racemate, are commercially available. One of the wide applications include chemoselective hydrogenation, where BINAP is conjugated to rhodium.

Diphenylphosphine and especially diphenylphosphide derivatives are nucleophiles, so they add to carbon – heteroatom double bonds. For example, in the presence of concentrated hydrochloric acid at 100 °C, diphenylphosphine adds to the carbon atom in benzaldehyde to give (phenyl-(phenylmethyl)phosphoryl)benzene.

Ph_{2}PH + PhCHO → Ph_{2}P(O)CH_{2}Ph

Compared to tertiary phosphines, diphenylphosphine is weakly basic. The pKa of the protonated derivative is 0.03:

Ph_{2}PH_{2}^{+} ⇌ Ph_{2}PH + H^{+}

=== Handling properties ===
Diphenylphosphine readily oxidizes.

Ph_{2}PH + O_{2} → Ph_{2}P(O)OH

An intermediate in this oxidation is diphenylphosphine oxide. The use of the diphenylphosphine–borane complex, Ph_{2}PH•BH_{3} avoids the problem of phosphine oxidation by protecting the phosphine from oxidation and is available through chemical vendors.
