= Stable phosphorus radicals =

Family of chemical compounds

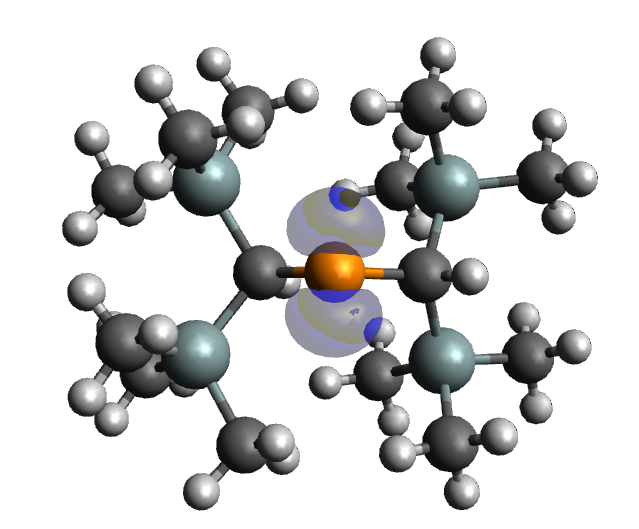
Spin Density map on phosphinyl radical found by NBO analysis.

Stable and persistent phosphorus radicals are phosphorus-centred radicals that are isolable and can exist for at least short periods of time. The common strategies for stabilising these phosphorus radicals usually include the delocalisation of the unpaired electron over a pi system or nearby electronegative atoms, and kinetic stabilisation with bulky ligands. Stable and persistent phosphorus radicals can be classified into three categories: neutral, cationic, and anionic radicals. Each of these classes involve various sub-classes, with neutral phosphorus radicals being the most extensively studied. Phosphorus exists as one isotope ^{31}P (I = 1/2) with large hyperfine couplings relative to other spin active nuclei, making phosphorus radicals particularly attractive for spin-labelling experiments.

== Neutral phosphorus radicals ==
Neutral phosphorus radicals include a large range of conformations with varying spin densities at the phosphorus. Generally, they can categorised as mono- and bi/di-radicals (also referred to as bisradicals and biradicaloids) for species containing one or two radical phosphorus centres respectively.

=== Monoradicals ===
In 1966, Muller et al. published the first electron paramagnetic resonance (EPR/ESR) spectra displaying evidence for the existence of phosphorus-containing radicals. Since then a variety of phosphorus monoradicals have been synthesised and isolated. Common ones include phosphinyl (R_{2}P^{•}), phosphonyl (R_{2}PO^{•}), and phosphoranyl (R_{4}P^{•}) radicals.

==== Synthesis ====
Synthetic methods for obtaining neutral phosphorus mondoradicals include photolytic reduction of trivalent phosphorus chlorides, P-P homolytic cleavage, single electron oxidation of phosphines, and cleavage of P-S or P-Se bonds.

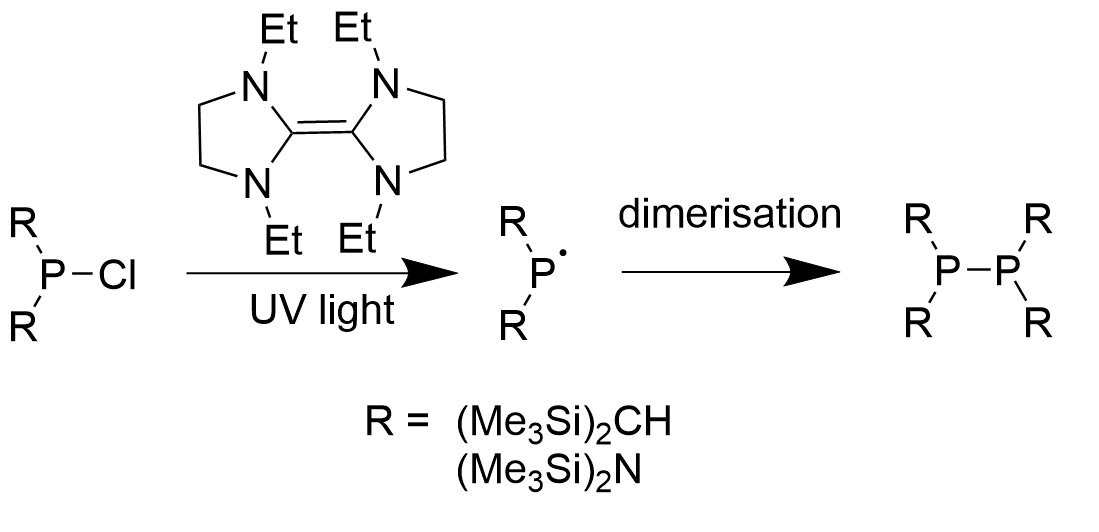
Photolysis of three-coordinate phosphorus chloride for the synthesis of [(Me_{3}Si)_{2}N]_{2}P^{•} by Lappert and co-workers.

The first persistent two-coordinate phosphorus-centred radicals [(Me_{3}Si)_{2}N]_{2}P^{•} and [(Me_{3}Si)_{2}CH]_{2}P^{•} were reported in 1976 by Lappert and co-workers. They are prepared by photolysis of the corresponding three-coordinate phosphorus chlorides in toluene in the presence of an electron-rich olifin. In 2000, the Power group found that this species can be synthesised from the dissolution, melting or evaporation of the dimer.

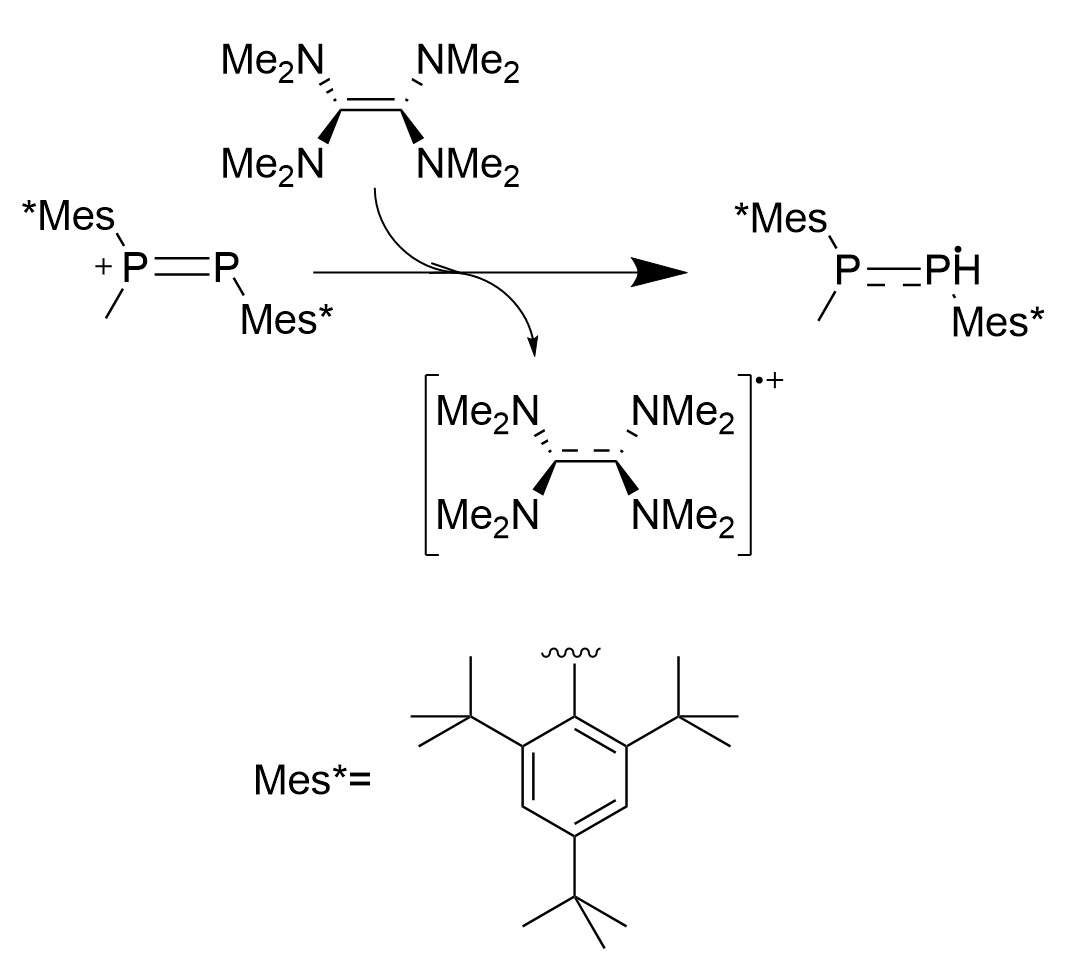
Synthesis of the first stable diphosphanyl radical [Mes*MeP-PMes*]^{•} by Grützmacher and co-workers via reduction of phosphonium salt.

In 2001, Grützmacher et al. reported the first stable diphosphanyl radical [Mes*MeP-PMes*]^{•} (Mes = 1,3,5-trimethylbenzene) from the reduction of the phosphonium salt [Mes*MeP-PMes*]^{+}(O_{3}SCF_{3})^{−} in an acetonitrile solution containing tetrakis(dimethylamino)ethylene (TDE) at room temperature, yielding yellow crystals. The monomer is stable below -30 ºC in the solid state for a few days. At room temperature the species decomposes in solution and in the solid state with a half life of 30 minutes at 3 × 10^{−2} M.

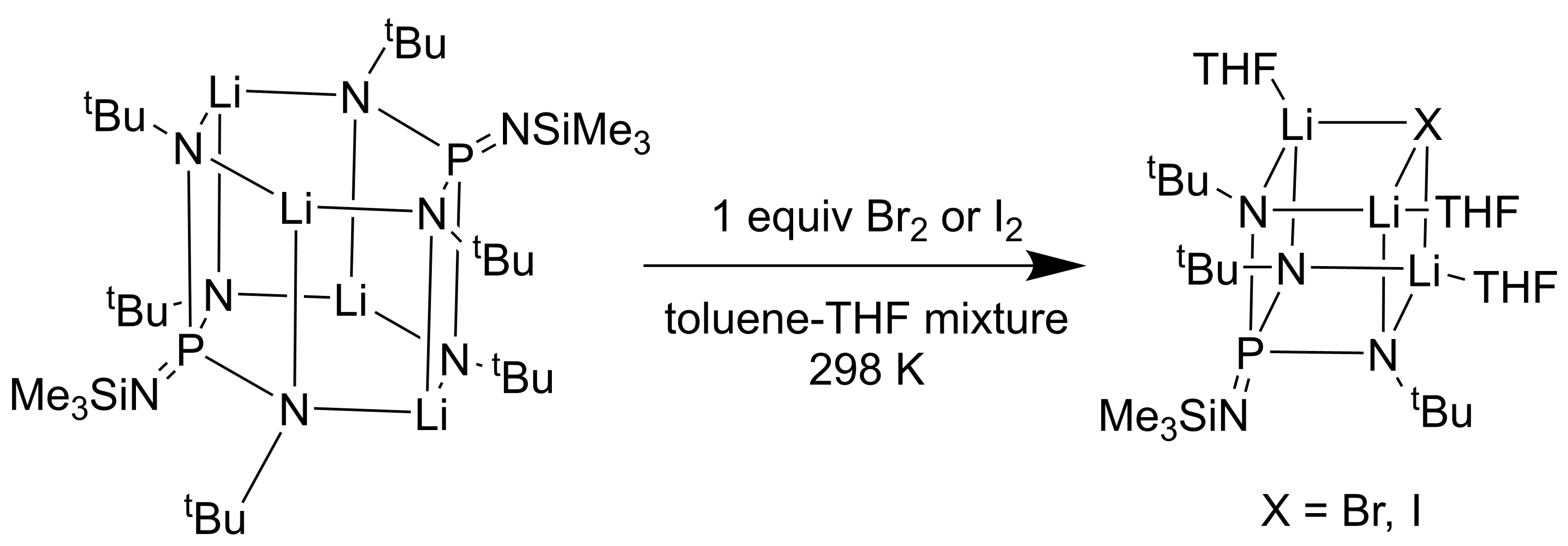
Synthesis of [Me_{3}SiNP(μ_{3}-NtBu)_{3}{μ_{3}-Li(thf)}_{3}X]^{•} (X = Br, I) by Armstrong and co-workers via oxidation.

The first structurally characterised phosphorus radical [Me_{3}SiNP(μ_{3}-NtBu)_{3}{μ_{3}-Li(thf)}_{3}X]^{•} (X = Br, I) was synthesised by Armstrong et al. in 2004 by the oxidation of the starting material with halogens bromide or iodine in a mixture of toluene and THF at 297 K. This produces blue crystals that can be characterised by X-ray crystallography. The steric bulk of the alkyl-imido groups was identified as playing a major role in the stabilising of these radicals.

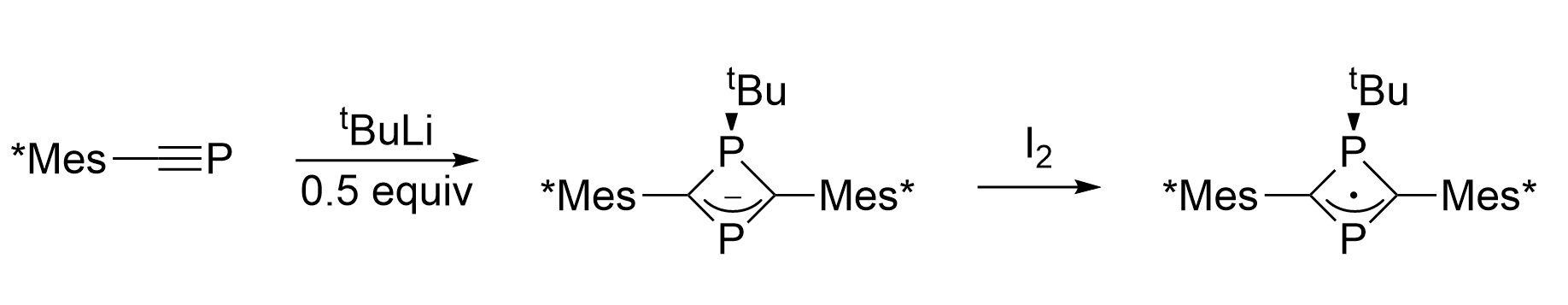
Synthesis of air tolerant and air stable 1,3-diphosphayclobutenyl radical by Ito and co-workers via reduction.

In 2006, Ito et al. prepared an air tolerant and thermally stable 1,3-diphosphayclobutenyl radical. Sterically bulky phospholkyne (Mes*C≡P) is treated with 0.5 equiv of t-BuLi in THF to form a 1,3 diphosphaalkyl anion. This is reduced with iodine solution to form a red product. The species is a planar four-membered diphosphacyclobutane (C_{2}P_{2}) ring with the Mes* having torsional angles with the C_{2}P_{2} plane.

===== Metal stabilised radicals =====
In 2007, Cummins et al. synthsised a phosphorus radical using nitridovanadium trisanilide metallo-ligands with similar form to Lappert, Power and co-workers' "jack-in-the-box" diphosphines. This is made by the synthesis of the radical precursor ClP[NV{N(Np)Ar}]_{3}]_{2} followed by its one electron reduction with Ti[N(tBu)Ar]_{3} or potassium graphite to yield dark brown crystals in 77% yield. EPR data showed delocalisation of electron spin across the two ^{51}V and one ^{31}P nuclei. This was consistent with computation, supporting the reported resonance structures. This delocalisation across the vanadium atoms was identified as the source of stabilisation for this species due to the ease for transition metals to undergo one-electron chemistry. Cummins and co-workers postulated that the p-character of the system could be tuned by changing the metal centres.

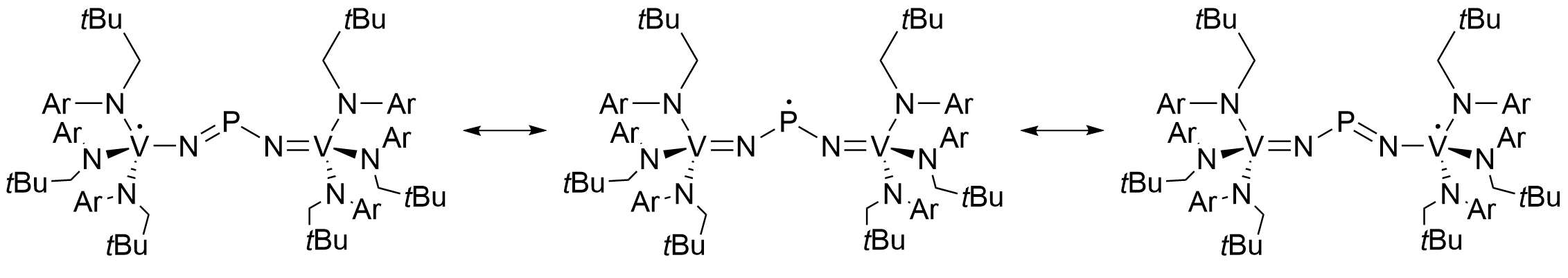
Resonance structures of [P{NV[N(Np)Ar]_{3}}_{2}]^{•} showing delocalisation of radical across vanadium and phosphorus nuclei.

Other metals stabilised radicals have been reported by Scheer et al, and Schneider et al using ligand containing tungsten and osmium respectively.

==== Structure and properties ====
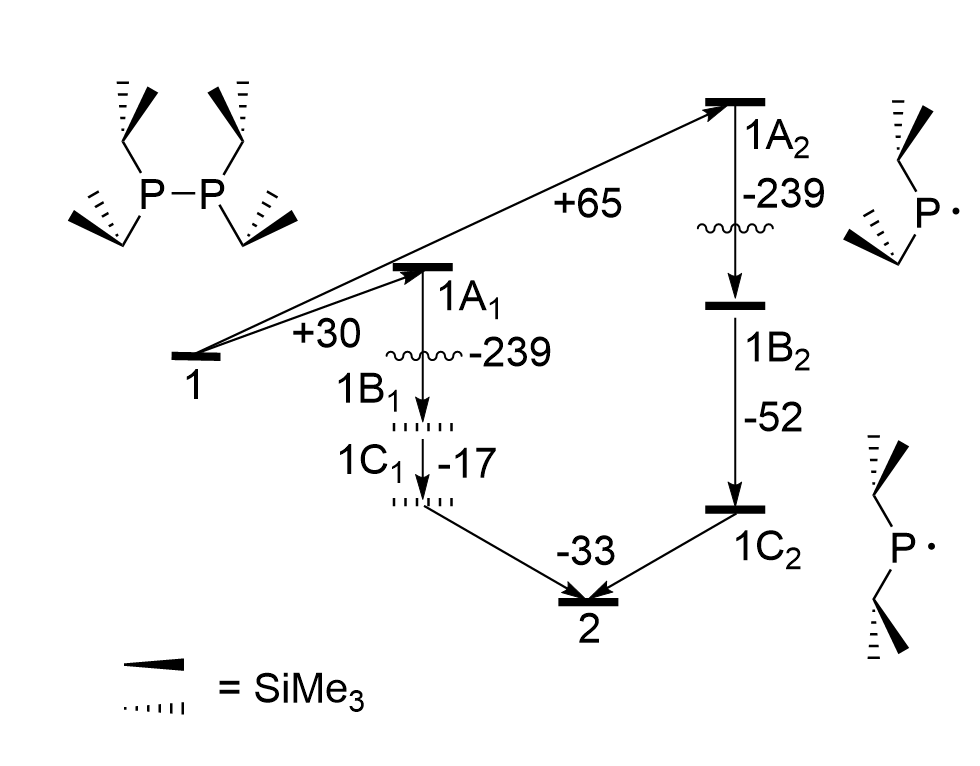
Schematic of DFT calculation results for diphosphine radical 1 in the solid state, the syn,anti-^{•}PR_{2} radical (1A_{2} and 1A_{2} ), the H optimised radical (1B_{1} and 1B_{2}), the syn,anti-^{•}PR_{2} radical fully optimised (1C), and syn,syn-^{•}PR_{2} radical in optimised geometry 2. Energies are in kJ mol^{−1}. Illustrating the "Jack-in-the-box" model.

As previously mentioned, kinetic stabilisation through bulky ligands has been an effective strategy for producing persisting phosphorus radicals. Delocalisation of the electron has also shown a stabilising effect on phosphorus radical species. This conversely results in more delocalised spin densities, and lower coupling constants relative to ^{31}P localised electron spin. For this reason the spin localisation on the phosphorus atom varies widely for different phosphorus radical species.

Cyclic radicals like that by Ito at al have delocalisation across the rings. In this case X-ray, EPR spectroscopy, and ab initio calculations found that 80-90% of the spin was delocalised on the carbons in the C_{2}P_{2} ring and the rest on the phosphorus atoms. Despite this, the a_{P2} constant shows similar spectroscopic property to organic radicals that contain conjugated P=C doubles bond, justifying the resonance structure used for this species.

The phosphinyl radicals synthesised by Lappert and co-workers were found to be stable at room temperature for periods of over 15 days with no effect from short-term heating at 360 K. This stability was assigned to the steric bulk of the substituents and the absence of beta-hydrogen atoms. A structural study of this species conducted using X-ray crystallography, gas-phase electron diffraction, and ab initio molecular orbital calculations found that the source of this stability was not the bulkiness of the CH(SiMe_{3})_{2} ligands but the release of strain energy during homolytic cleavage at the P-P bond of the dimer that favoured the existence of the radical. The dimer shows a syn,anti conformation, which allows for better packing but has excessive crowding at the trimethylsilyl groups, while the radical monomer displays syn,syn conformation. Theoretical calculations showed that the process of cleaving the P-P bond (endothermic), relaxation to release steric strain, and rotation about the P-C bond to yield syn,syn conformation on the monomer radical (exothermic by 67.5 kJ for each unit) is an overall exothermic process. The stability of this species can therefore be attributed to the energy release of strain energy by the reorganisation of the ligands as the dimer converts to the radical monomer. This effect have been observed in other systems containing the CH(SiMe_{3})_{2} ligand and was dubbed the "Jack-in-the-box" model. Other ligand with similar flexibility, and ability to undergo conformational changes were identified as PnR_{2} (Pn - P, As, Sb) and ERR'_{2} (E = Si, Ge, Sn; R' = bulky ligand).

In 2022, Streubel and co-workers investigated the electron density distribution across centres in metal-coordinated phosphanoxyl complexes. This study showed that tungsten-containing radical complexes have small amounts of spin density on the metal nuclei while in the case of manganese and iron, the spins are purely metal-centred.

=== Biradicals ===
Biradicals are molecules bearing two unpaired electrons. These radicals can interact ferromagnetically (triplet), antiferromagnetically (open-shell singlet) or not interact at all (two-doublet). Biradicaloids/diradicaloids are a class of biradicals with significant radical centre interaction.

==== Synthesis ====
The first phosphorus biradical was reported in 2011 by T. Breweies and co-workers. The biradicaloid [P(μ-NR)]_{2} (R=Hyp, Ter) was synthesised by the reduction of cyclo-1,3-diphospha (III)-2,4-diazanes using [(Cp_{2}TiCl}_{2}] as the reducing agent. The bulky Ter (trimesitylphenyl) and Hyp (hypersilyl) substituents provide a large stabilising effect. This effect is more pronounced with Ter where the biradical is stable in inert atmospheres in the solid state for long periods of time at temperatures up to 224 C. Computational studies determined that the [P(μ-NTer)]_{2} radical shows an openshell singlet ground state biradical character.

Villinger et al later synthesised a stable cyclopentane-1,3-diyl biradical by the insertion of CO into a P–N bond of diphosphadiazanediyl.

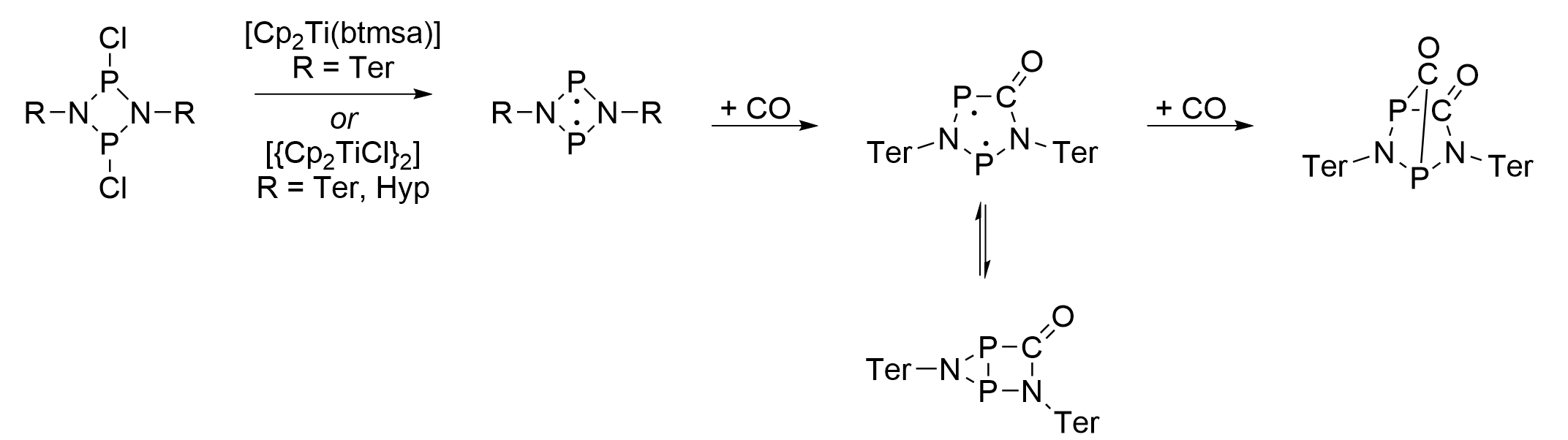
Synthesis of [P(μ-NR)]_{2} (R=Hyp, Ter) via reduction of cyclo-1,3-diphospha(III)-2,4-diazanes and subsequent CO insertion by Villinger and co-workers.

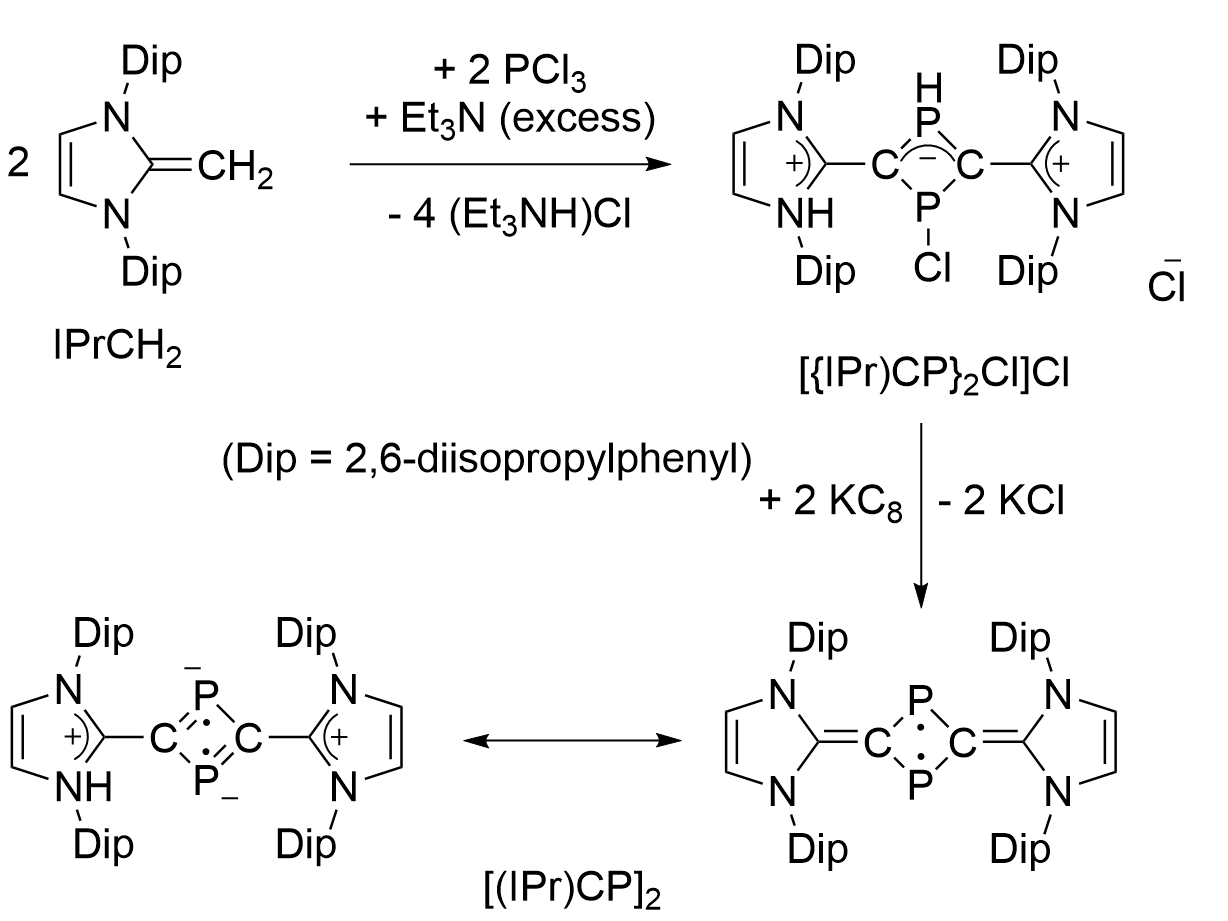
Synthesis of (iPr)CP]_{2} radical via reduction by Rottschafer and co-workers with resonance structures.

In 2017 D. Rottschäfer et al reported a N-heterocyclic vinylindene-stabilised singlet biradicaloid phosphorus compound (iPr)CP]_{2} (iPr = 1,3-bis(2,6-diisopropylphenyl)imidazol-2-ylidene). Significant π-e^{−} density is transferred to C_{2}P_{2} ring. The species was found to be diamagnetic with temperature-independent NMR resonances, so can be considered a non-Kekulé molecule.

==== Structure and properties ====
The species by Villinger can undergo reaction with phosphaalkyne forming a five-membered P_{2}N_{2}C heterocycle with a P-C bridge. It can also undergo halogenation and reaction with elemental sulfur.

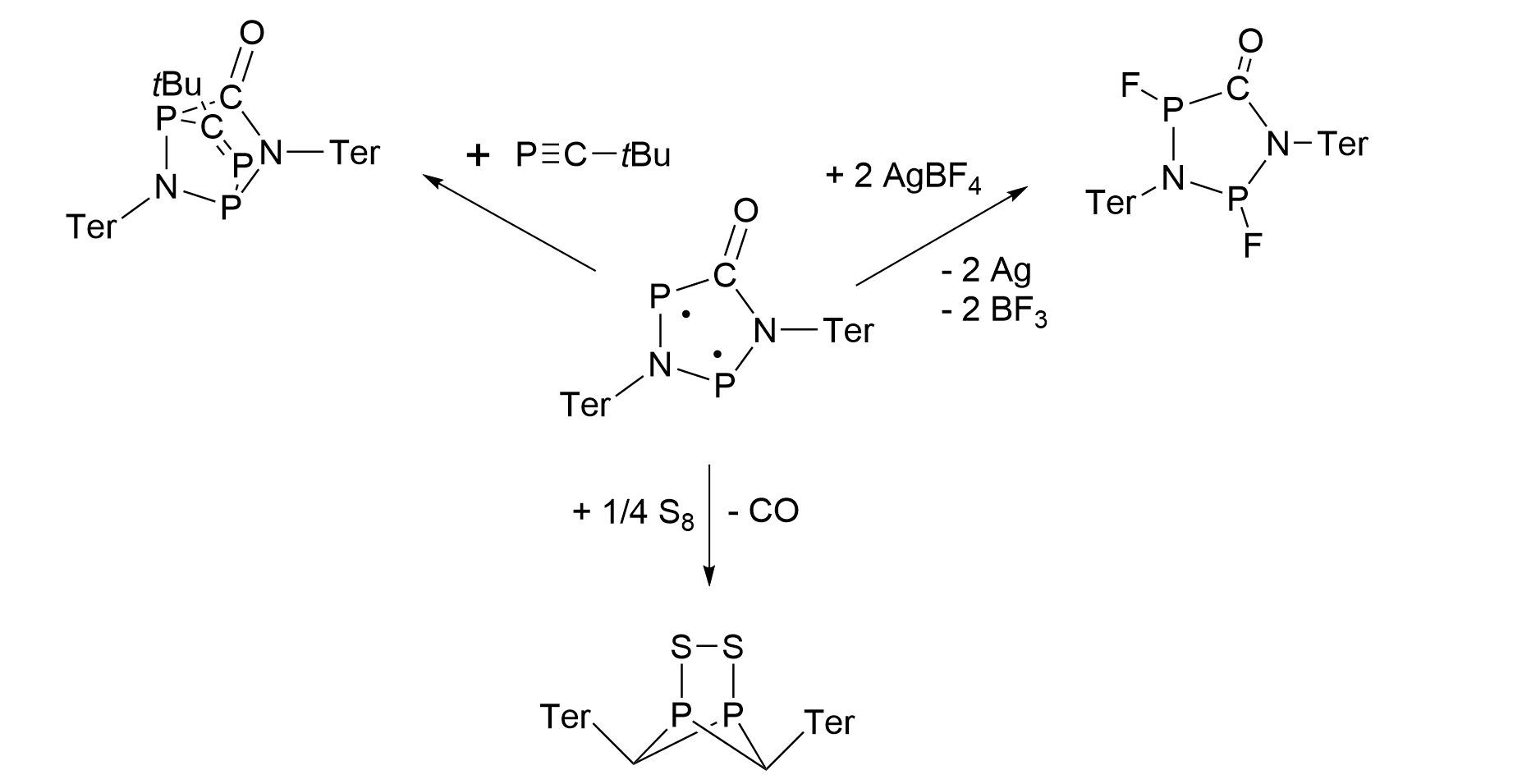
Reactivity of [P(μ-NR)]_{2} (R=Hyp, Ter) radical.

=== Characterisation ===
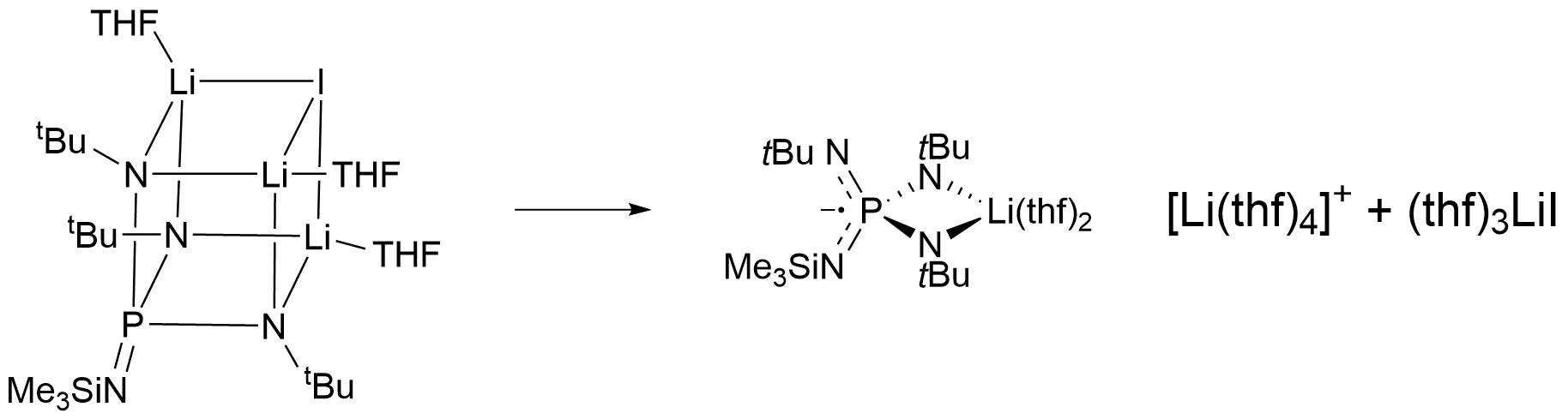
Solvation of lithium ions in [Me_{3}SiNP(μ_{3}-NtBu)_{3}{μ_{3}-Li(thf)}_{3}I]^{•} in very dilute THF solutions.

Phosphorus radicals are commonly characterized by EPR/ESR to elucidate the spin localisation of the radical across the radical species. Higher coupling constants are indicative of higher localisation on phosphorus nuclei. Quantum chemical calculations on these systems are also used to support this experimental data.

Before the characterization by X-ray crystallography by Armstrong et al, the structure of the phosphorus centred radical [(Me_{3}Si)_{2}CH]_{2}P^{•} had been determined by electron diffraction. The diphosphanyl radical [Mes*MeP-PMes*]^{•} had been stabilised through doping into crystals of Mes*MePPMeMes*. The radical synthesised by Armstrong et al was found to exist as a distorted PN_{3}Li_{3}X cube in the solid state. They found that upon dissolution in THF, this cubic structure is disrupted, leaving the species to form a solvent-separated ion pair.

== Phosphorus radical cations ==
=== Synthesis ===
Phosphorus radical cations are often obtained from the one-electron oxidation of diphosphinidenes and phosphalkenes.

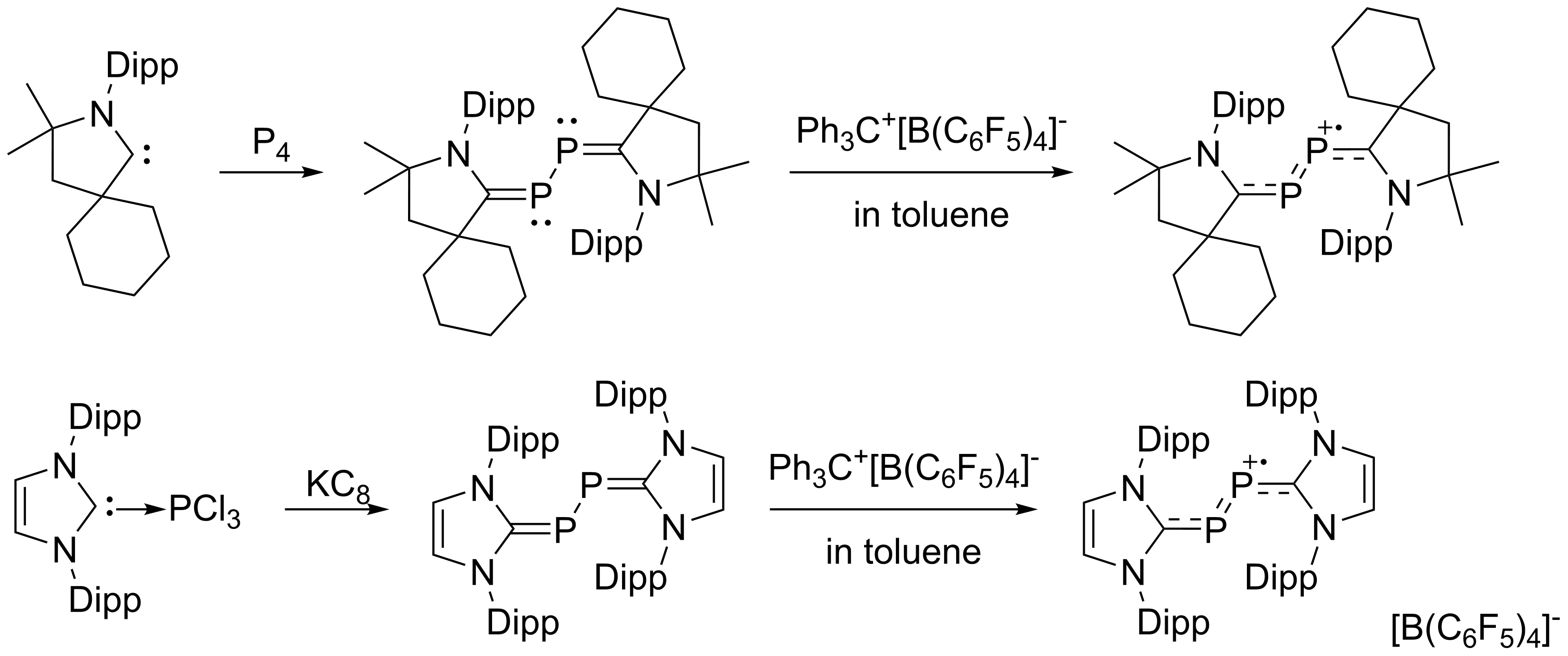
Synthesis of [(cAAC)2P2]•+ and [(NHC)2P2]•+ via oxidation with Ph_{3}C^{+}B(C_{6}F_{5})_{4}^{−} by Bertrand and co-workers.

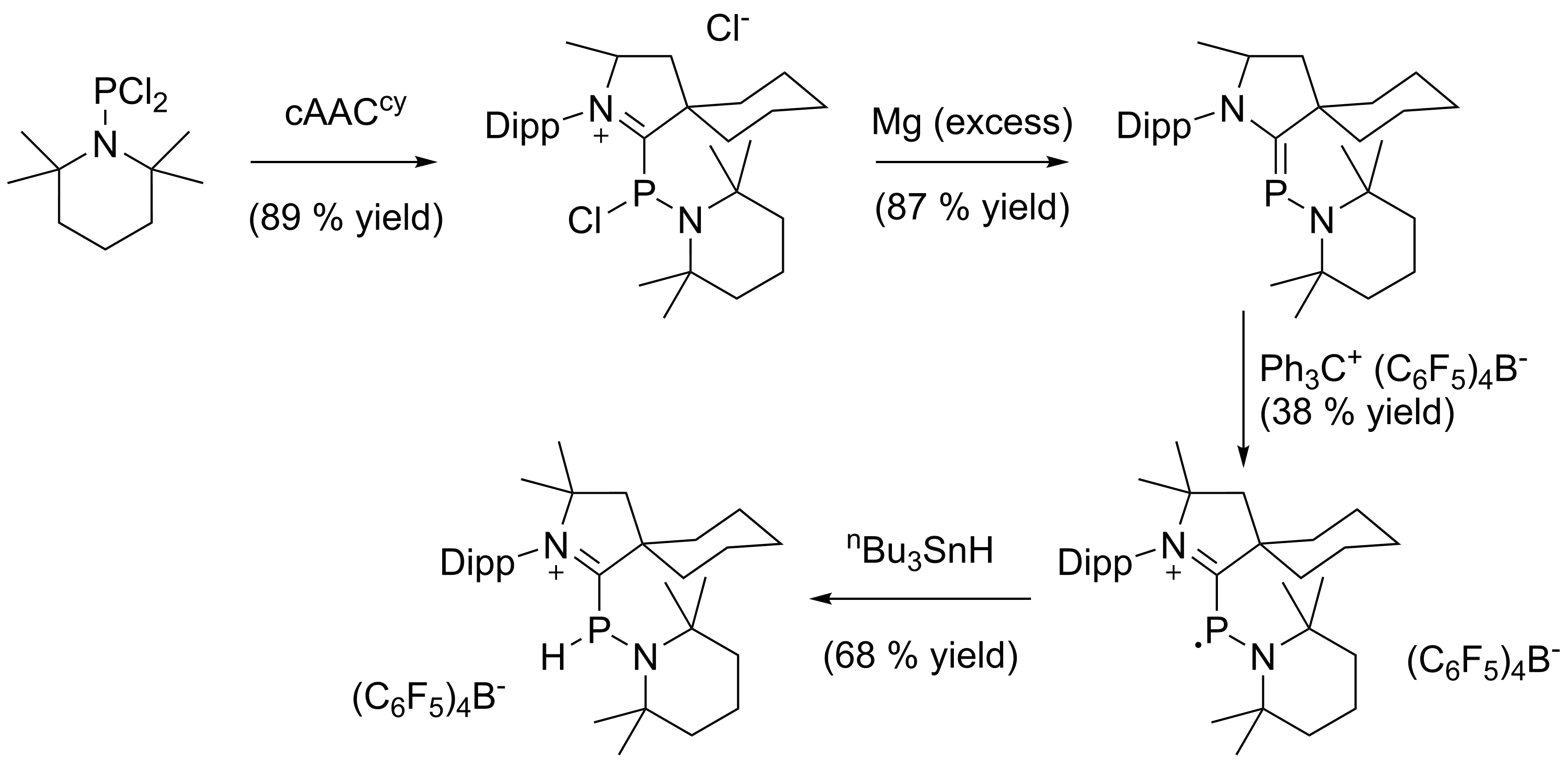
Synthesis of [(TMP)P(cAAC)]^{•+} via oxidation with Ph_{3}C^{+} (C_{6}F_{5})_{4}B^{−} by Bertrand and co-workers.

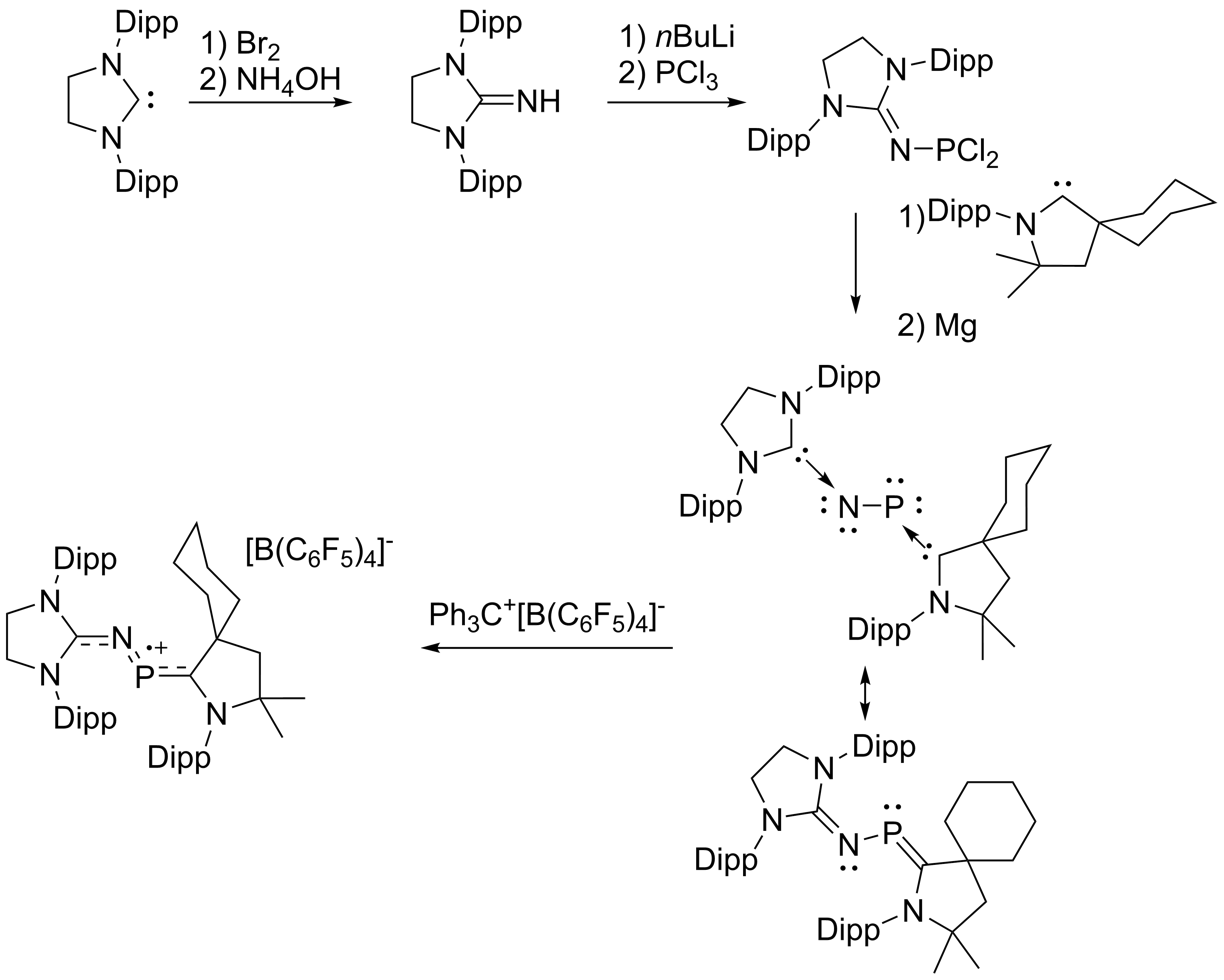
Synthesis of [bis(carbene)-PN]^{•+} visa oxidation with h_{3}C^{+} (C_{6}F_{5})_{4}B^{−} by Bertrand and co-workers.

In 2010, the Bertrand group found that carbene-stabilised diphosphinidenes can undergo one-electron oxidation in toluene with Ph_{3}C^{+}B(C_{6}F_{5})_{4}^{−} at room temperature in inert atmosphere to produce radical cations (Dipp=2,6-Diisopropylphenyl). The Bertrand group reported the synthesis of [(cAAC)P_{2}]^{•+} , [(NHC)P_{2}]^{•+} and [(NHC)P_{2}]^{++}. The EPR signal for [(cAAC)P2]•+ is a triplet of quintents, resulting form coupling to with 2 P nuclei and a small coupling with 2 N nuclei. NBO analysis showed spin delocalisation across two phosphorus atoms (0.27e each) and nitrogen atoms(0.14e each). Contrastingly, the [(NHC)P_{2}]^{•+}complex showed delocalisation mostly on phosphorus (0.33e and 0.44e) with little contribution of other elements. Other diradicals synthesised by the Bertrand group involved species single phosphorus atoms. These included [(TMP)P(cAAC)]^{•+} where spin is localised on phosphorus (67%) and [bis(carbene)-PN]^{•+} with spin density distributed over phosphorus (0.40e), central nitrogen atom (0.18e), and N atom of cAAC (0.19e). Treatment with this later cation with KC_{8} returns it to its neutral analogue.

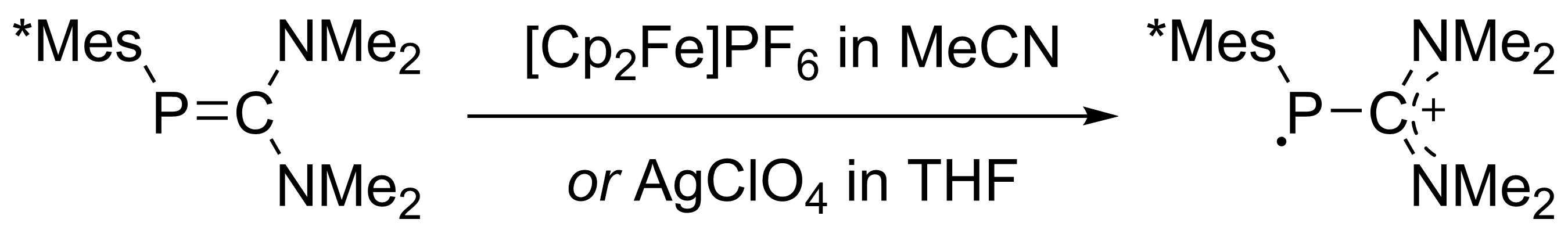
Synthesis of Mes*P^{•}-(C(NMe_{2})_{2})^{+} via a one electron oxidation of a phosphaalkenes with [Cp_{2}Fe]PF_{6} by Geoffroy and co-workers.

In 2003, Geoffroy et al. synthesised Mes*P^{•}-(C(NMe_{2})_{2})^{+} through a one electron oxidation of a phosphaalkenes with [Cp_{2}Fe]PF_{6}. A solution of Mes*P^{•}-(C(NMe_{2})_{2})^{+} is stable in inert atmosphere in the solid state for a few weeks and a few days in solution. Hyperfine couplings on EPR show strong localisation of the spin to the phosphorus nuclei (0.75e in p orbital). In 2015, the Wang group was able to isolate the crystal structure of this species with use of the oxidant of a weakly coordinating anion Ag[Al(ORF)4]^{−}. The electron spin density, found by EPR, resides principally on phosphorus 3p and 3s orbitals (68.2% and 2.46% respectively). This was supported by DFT calculations where 80.9% of spin density was found to be localised on phosphorus atom.

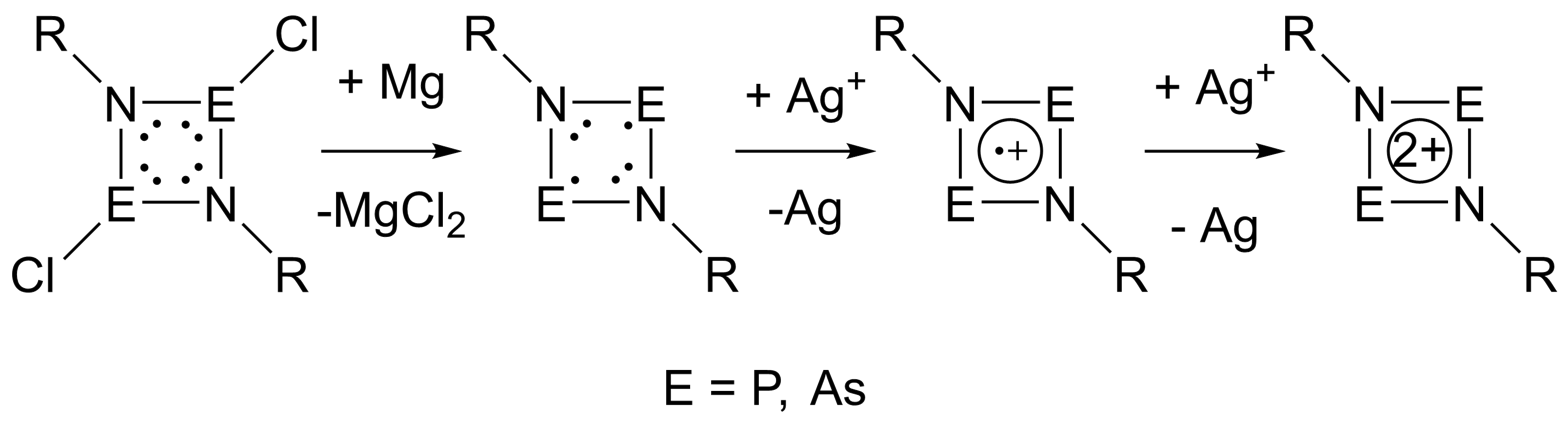
General scheme for preparation of cyclic radical cations via oxidation.

Weakly coordinating anions were also used to stabilise cyclic biradical cations synthesised by Schulz and colleagues where the spin density was found to reside exclusively on the phosphorus atoms (0.46e each) in the case of [P(μ-NTer)2P]^{•+}. In the case of [P(μ-NTer)2As]^{•+} the spin was found to mostly reside on the As nuclei (70.6% on As compared to 29.4% on P atom). Many other cyclic radical cations have been reported.

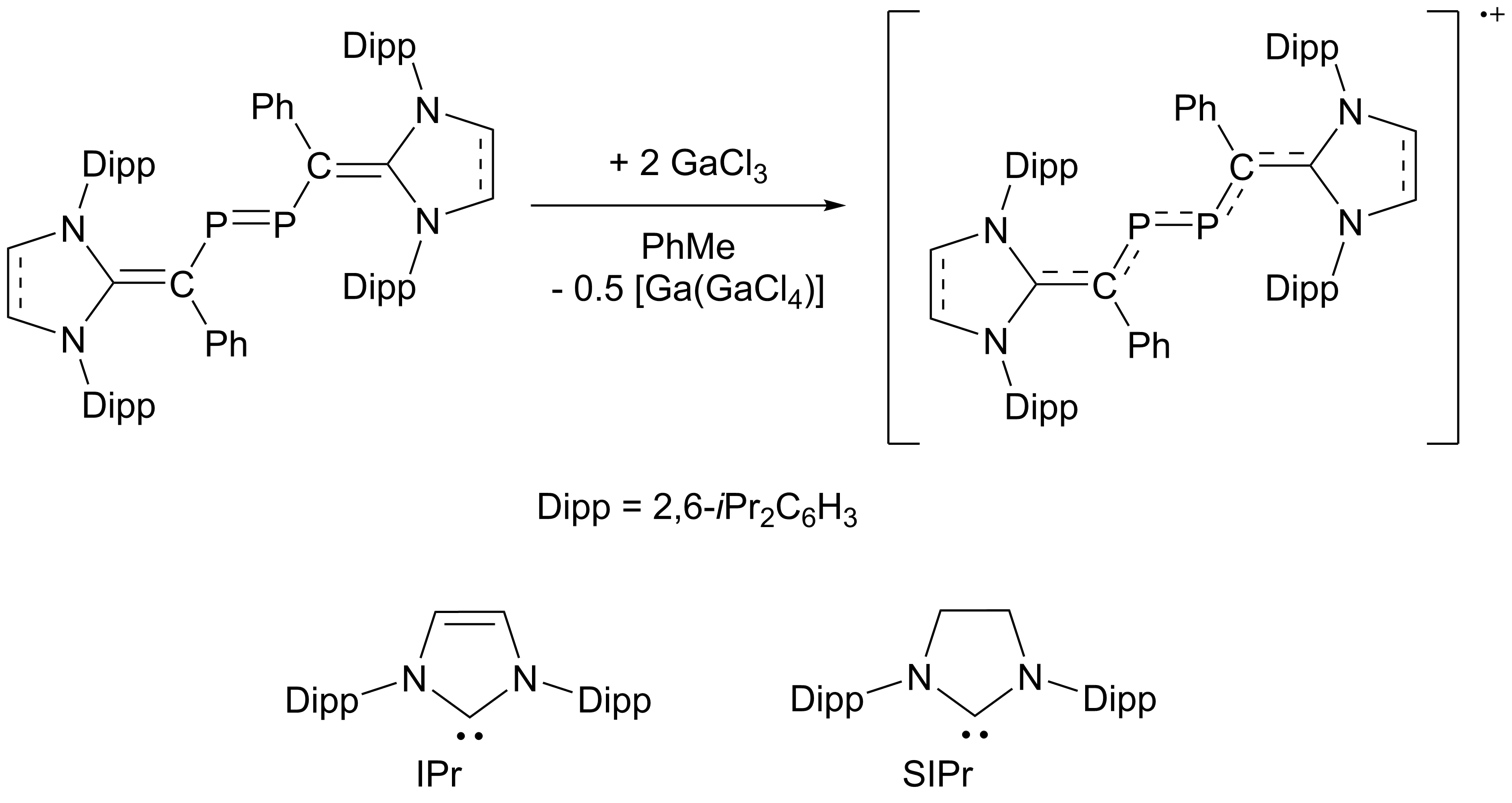
Synthesis of divinyldiphosphene radical cations via oxidation with GaCl_{3} by Ghadwal and co-workers.

It is difficult to form radical cations with diphosphenes due to low lying HOMO at the phosphorus centre. Ghadwal and co-workers were able to synthesise a diphosphene radical cation [{(NHC)C(Ph)}P]_{2}^{•+} using an NHC-derived divinyldiphosphene with a high lying HOMO and a small HOMO–LUMO gap. The stability of the species was identified as the delocalisation of the spin density across the CP_{2}C-unit. The spin density was found to be 11-14% on each P nuclei and 17-21% on each C nuclei.

=== Structure and properties ===
A unique source of stability for phosphorus radical cations is the electrostatic repulsion between radical cations that prevents dimerisation.

Weakly coordinating anions have been used to stabilise biradical cations.

== Phosphorus radical anions ==
=== Synthesis ===
The most common method for accessing radical anions is through the use of reducing agents.

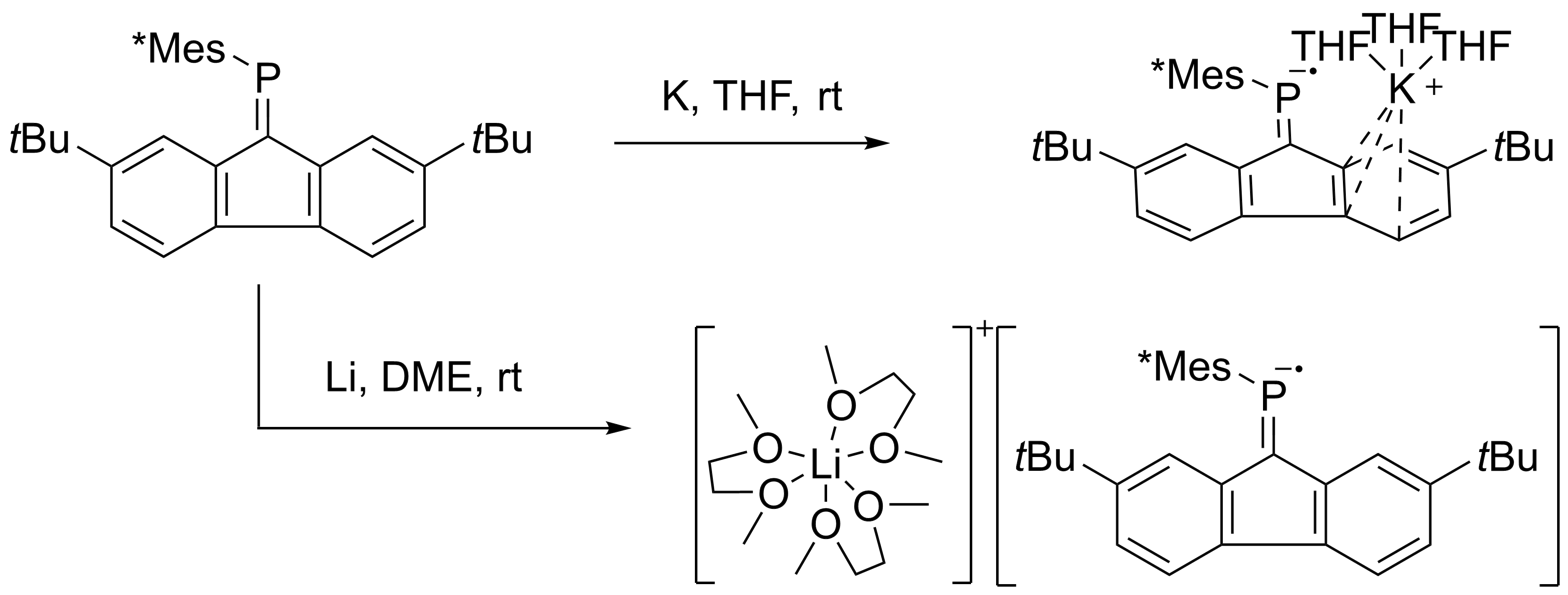
Synthesis of phosphorus-centred radical anion via reduction using K or Li by Wang and co-workers.

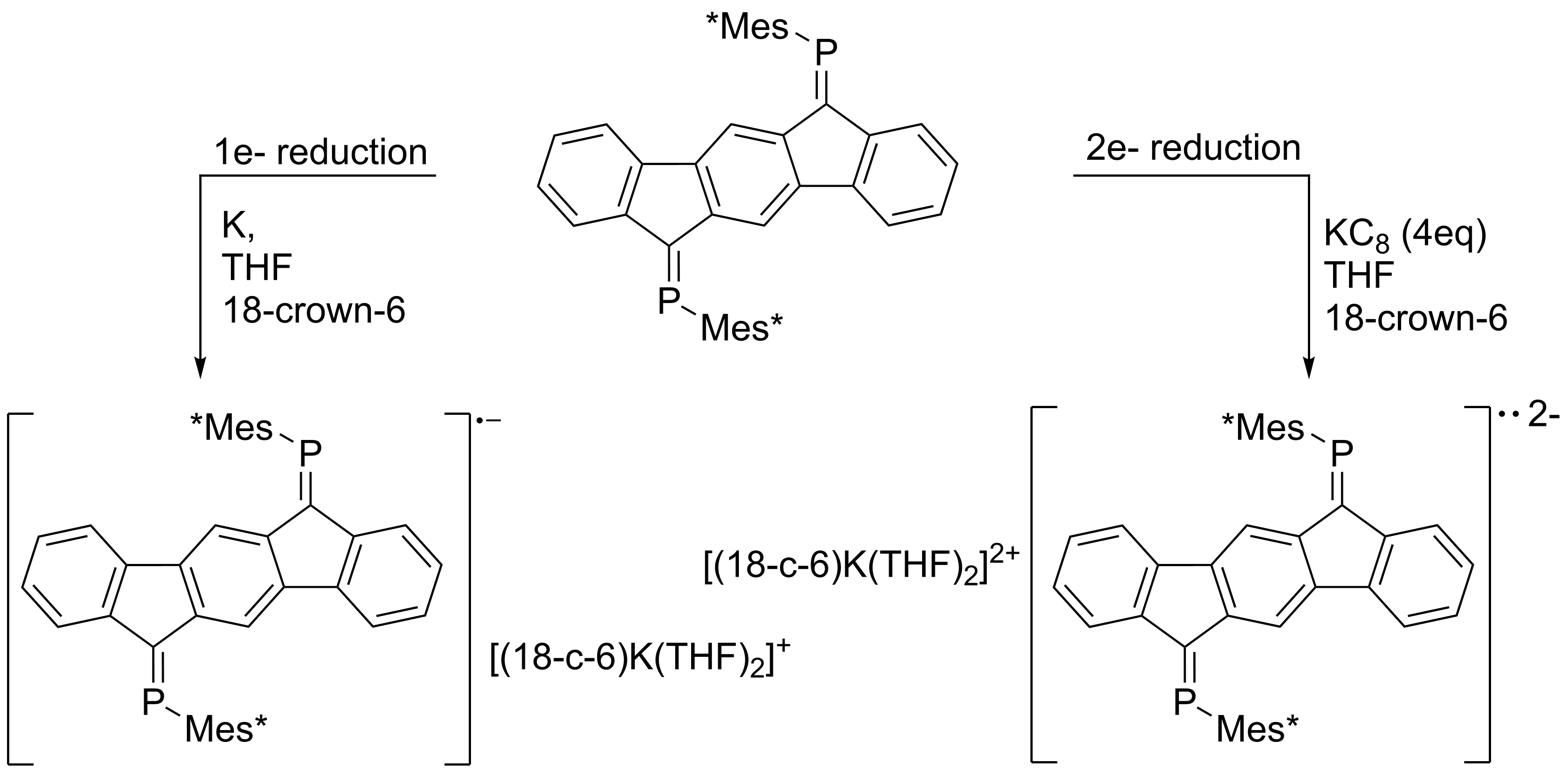
Synthesis of diphosphorus-centred radical anion and the di-radical di-anion via reduction with KC8 by Wang and co-workers.

In 2014 the Wang group reported the synthesis of a phosphorus-centred radical anion through the reduction of a phosphaalkene using either Li in DME or K in THF yielding purple crystals. EPR data showed localisation of the spin on 3p (51.09%) and 3s (1.62%) orbitals of phosphorus. They later synthesised a diphosphorus-centred radial anion and the first di-radical di-anion from the reduction of the diphosphaalkene with KC8 in THF in the presence of 18-crown-6. In both cases the spin density resides principally on the phosphorus nuclei.

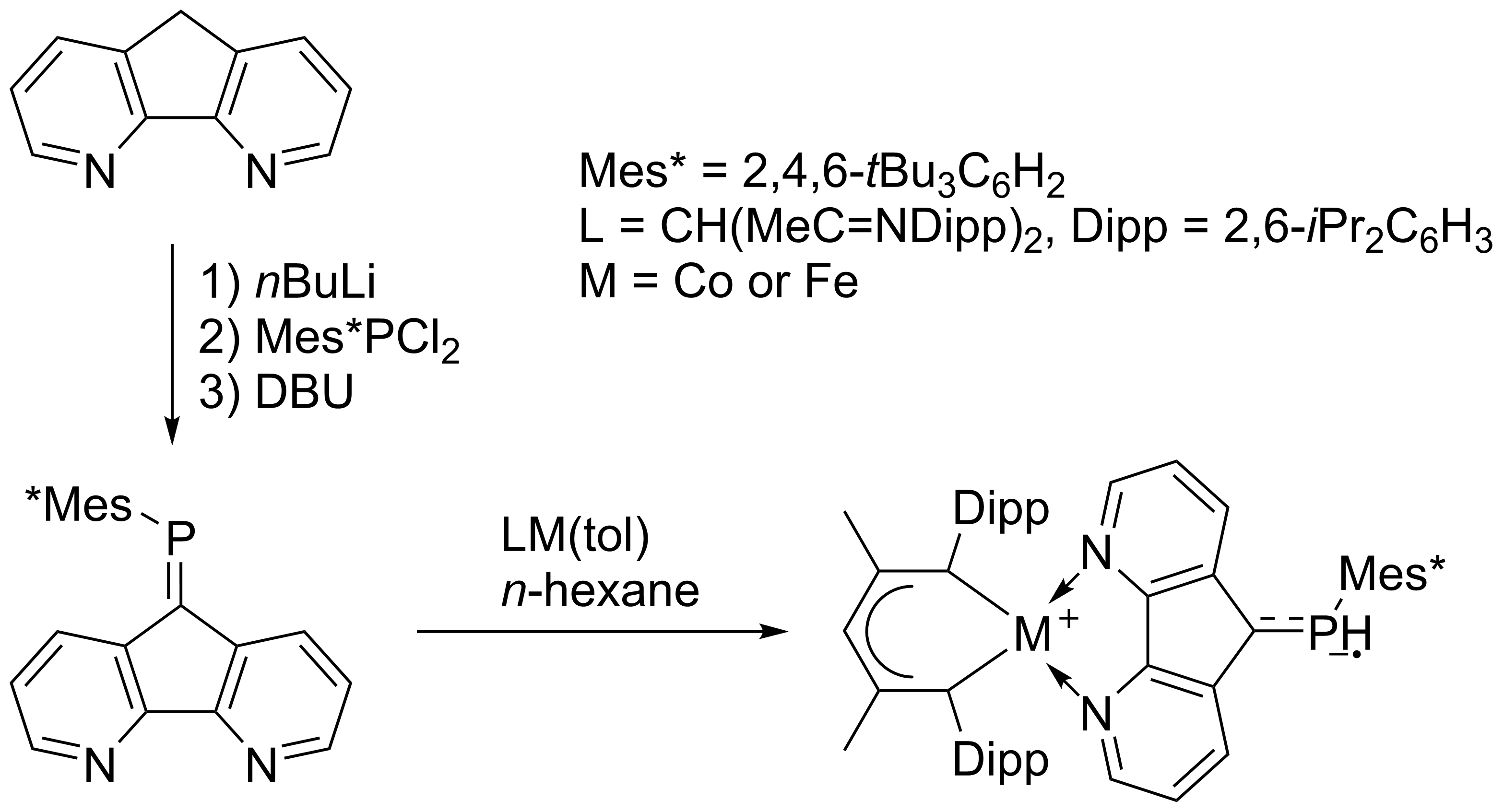
Synthesis of phosphorus radical anion coordinated with Co^{II} and Fe^{II} complexes by Tan and co-workers.

Tan and co-workers used a charge transfer approach to synthesis the phosphorus radical anion coordinated Co^{II} and Fe^{II} complexes. Here diazafluorenylidene-substituted phosphaalkene is reacted with low valent transition metal complexes to form phosphorus radical anions coordinated with metal complexes. This species displays a quartet ground state showing weak antiferromagnetic interaction of the phosphorus radical with the high-spim TM^{II} ion. The spin density is mostly localised on TM and phosphorus nuclei. The group further synthesised radical anion lanthanide complexes which also showed antiferromagnetic interaction.

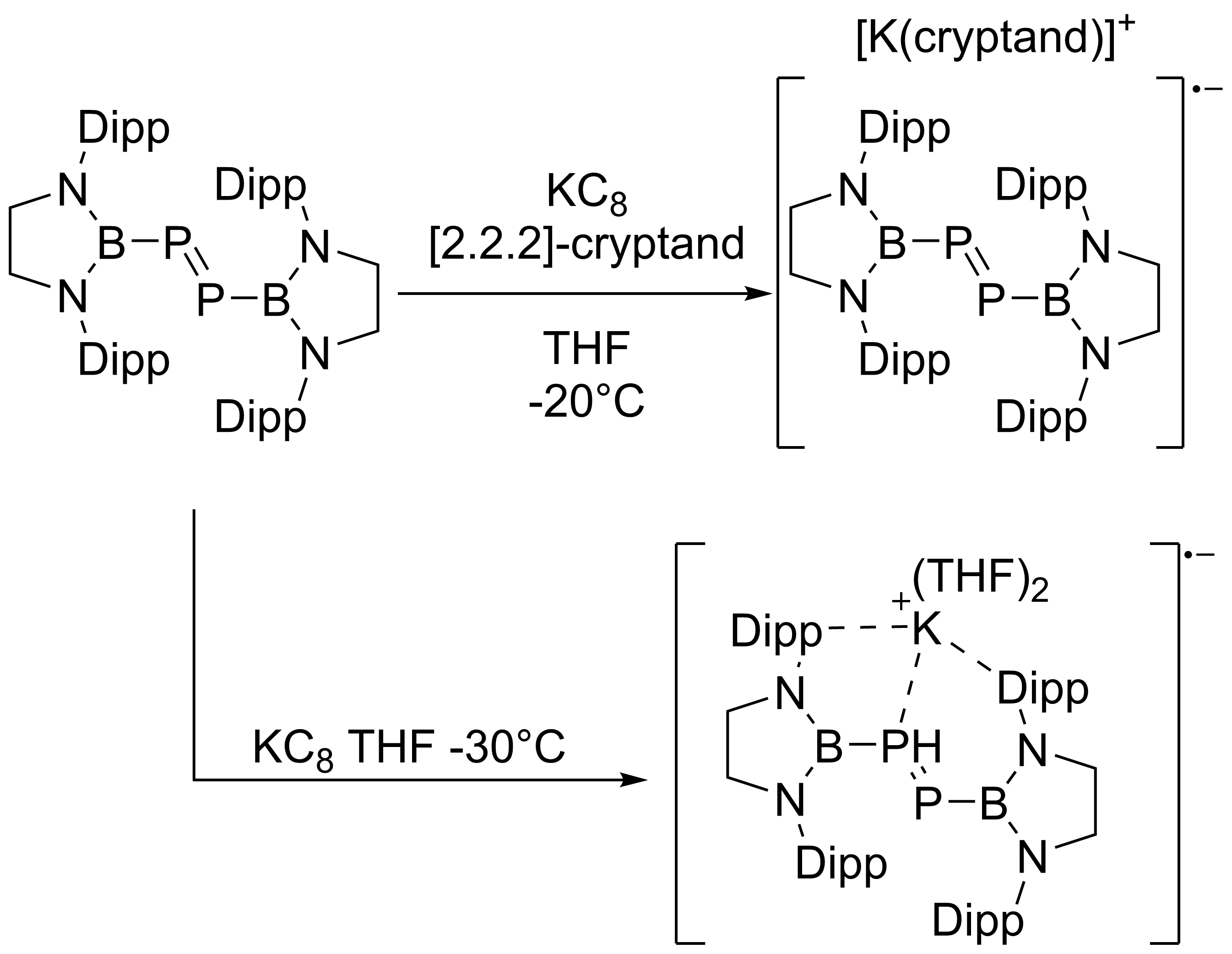
Synthesis of phosphorus radical anion with boryl substituents by Yamashita and co-workers.

The π-acid properties of boryl substituents were employed by Yamashita and co-workers to stabilise phosphorus radical anions. Here the diazafluorenylidene-substituted phosphaalkene is reacted with [Cp*_{2}Ln][BPh_{4}] (Ln = Dy, Tb, and Gd) followed by reduction with KC_{8} in the absence or presence of 2,2,2-cryptand yielding complexes with radical anion phosphaalkene fragments. EPR and DFT calculations indicate spin density mostly localised on the P nuclei (67.4%).
