= Phosphaalkene =

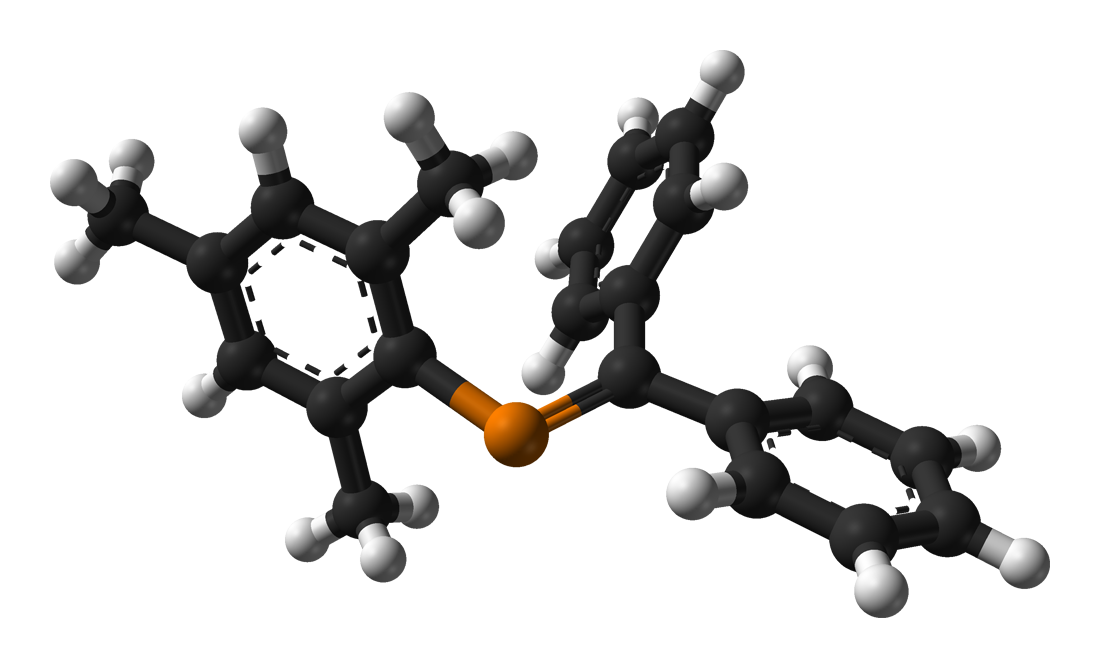
Ball-and-stick model of mesityldiphenylmethylenephosphine, a phosphaalkene

Phosphaalkenes (IUPAC name: alkylidenephosphanes) are organophosphorus compounds with double bonds between carbon and phosphorus(III) with the formula R_{2}C=PR. In the compound phosphorine one carbon atom in benzene is replaced by phosphorus. The reactivity of phosphaalkenes is often compared to that of alkenes and not to that of imines because the HOMO of phosphaalkenes is not the phosphorus lone pair (as in imines the amine lone pair) but the double bond. Therefore like alkenes, phosphaalkenes engage in Diels-Alder reactions and Wittig and Cope rearrangements.

Phosphaalkenes appear in academic research as polymerization monomers and as π-accepting ligands (similar to a strained alkene).

A special case of the phosphaalkenes are the phosphaallenes, in which the carbon atom is attached to a second double bond, to another carbon atom.

The first phosphaalkene discovered was a phosphabenzene, by Mërkl in 1969. The first localized phosphaalkene was reported in 1976 by Gerd Becker as a keto-enol tautomerism akin a Brook rearrangement:

Becker's method continues to see use in, e.g., a phosphorus analogue to poly(para-phenylene vinylene):

.

In 1976, Harold Kroto also established spectroscopically that thermolysis of Me_{2}PH generates CH_{2}=PMe. A general method for the synthesis of phosphaalkenes is by 1,2-elimination of suitable precursors, initiated thermally or by base such as DBU, DABCO or triethylamine:

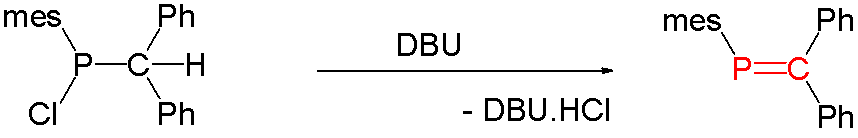

A more modern synthesis is the phospha-Wittig-Horner reaction, which combines a carbonyl compound with a phosphoryl organophosphide (diphosphorus ylide).

The reduction or oxidation of phosphaalkenes can produce radical phosphorus ions.
